= List of non-marine molluscs of Malaysia =

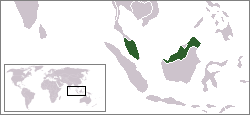
Location of Malaysia

The non-marine mollusks of Malaysia are a part of the molluscan wildlife of Malaysia. A number of species of non-marine mollusks are found in the wild in Malaysia.

== Freshwater gastropods ==
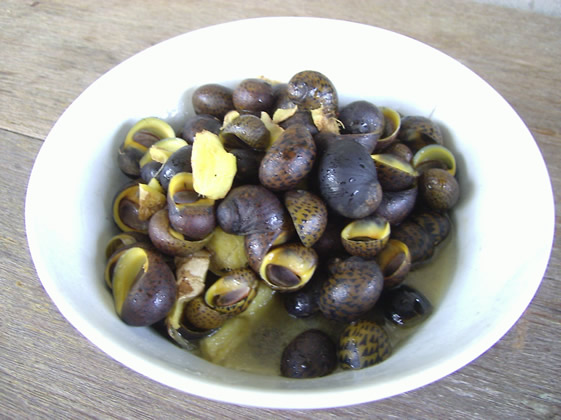
Freshwater nerites are used in Malaysian cuisine

Ampullariidae

- Pila ampullacea (Linnaeus, 1758)
- Pila scutata (Mousson, 1848)
- Pomacea canaliculata (Lamarck, 1819) - golden apple snail

Nassariidae

- Clea bangueyensis EA Smith, 1895
- Clea nigricans A Adams, 1885

Neritidae

- Neritina pulligera (Linnaeus, 1767)
- Septaria porcellana (Linnaeus, 1858)
- Vittina coromandeliana (Sowerby, 1836)
- Vittina variegata (Lesson, 1831)

Pachychilidae

- Sulcospira pageli (Thiele, 1908)

Viviparidae

- Sinotaia guangdungensis (Kobelt, 1906)

Paludomidae

- Paludomus everetti EA Smith, 1894
- Paludomus luteus Adams, 1874

Physidae

- Physella acuta (Draparnaud, 1805)

Planorbidae

- Indoplanorbis exustus (Deshayes, 1834)

Thiaridae

- Mieniplotia scabra (OF Müller, 1774)
- Melanoides tuberculata (OF Müller, 1774) - red-rimmed melania
- Tarebia granifera (Lamarck, 1822) - quilted melania

== Land gastropods ==
Assimineidae

- Acmella bauensis Marzuki, Liew & Mohd-Azlan, 2021
- Acmella cyrtoglyphe Vermeulen, Liew & Schilthuizen, 2015
- Acmella umbilicata Vermeulen, Liew & Schilthuizen, 2015
- Acmella ovoidea Vermeulen, Liew & Schilthuizen, 2015
- Acmella nana Vermeulen, Liew & Schilthuizen, 2015
- Acmella paeninsularis Foon & Marzuki, 2022
- Acmella subcancellata Vermeulen, Liew & Schilthuizen, 2015
- Acmella striata Vermeulen, Liew & Schilthuizen, 2015
- Anaglyphula sauroderma Vermeulen, Liew & Schilthuizen, 2015
- Solenomphala scalaris (Heude, 1882)

Cyclophoridae

- Craspedotropis borneensis (Godwin-Austen, 1889)
- Cyclophorus aquilus (Sowerby, 1843)
- Cyclophorus aurantiacus pernobilis Gould, 1844
- Cyclophorus cantori (Benson, 1851)
- Cyclophorus expansus (Pfeiffer, 1853)
- Cyclophorus malayanus (Benson, 1852)
- Cyclophorus perdix borneensis (Metcalfe, 1851)
- Cyclophorus volvulus (O.F. Müller, 1774)
- Ditropopsis davisoni Vermeulen, Liew & Schilthuizen, 2015
- Ditropopsis everetti (E. A. Smith, 1895)
- Ditropopsis trachychilus Vermeulen, Liew & Schilthuizen, 2015
- Ditropopsis constricta Vermeulen, Liew & Schilthuizen, 2015
- Ditropopsis tyloacron Vermeulen, Liew & Schilthuizen, 2015
- Ditropopsis cincta Vermeulen, Liew & Schilthuizen, 2015
- Japonia anceps Vermeulen, Liew & Schilthuizen, 2015
- Japonia barbata (L. Pfeiffer, 1855)
- Japonia bauensis Marzuki, Liew & Mohd-Azlan, 2021
- Japonia metcalfei (Issel, 1874)
- Japonia mundyana (Godwin-Austen, 1889)
- Japonia rabongensis (E. A. Smith, 1895)
- Leptopoma sericatum (L. Pfeiffer, 1851)
- Leptopoma undatum (Metcalfe, 1851)
- Opisthoporus biciliatus (Mousson, 1849)
- Opisthoporus birostris (L. Pfeiffer, 1854)
- Opisthoporus cavernae (Godwin-Austen, 1889)
- Opisthoporus euryomphalus (L. Pfeiffer, 1856)
- Platyrhaphe linita (Godwin-Austen, 1889)
- Pterocyclos tenuilabiatus (Metcalfe, 1851)
- Scabrina belang Foon & Marzuki, 2022

Diplommatinidae

- Arinia linnei Maassen, 2008
- Arinia micro Marzuki & Foon, 2016
- Diplommatina adversa (H. Adams & A. Adams, 1851)
- Diplommatina azlani Marzuki, 2019
- Diplommatina bidentata Vermeulen, Liew & Schilthuizen, 2015
- Diplommatina busanensis Godwin-Austen, 1889
- Diplommatina concinna H. Adams, 1872
- Diplommatina heteropleura Vermeulen & Khalik, 2021
- Diplommatina isseli Godwin-Austen, 1889
- Diplommatina laidlawi Sykes, 1903
- Diplommatina maduana maduana Laidlaw, 1949
- Diplommatina moluensis E. A. Smith, 1893
- Diplommatina onyx Fulton, 1901
- Diplommatina spinosa Godwin-Austen, 1889
- Diplommatina toretos Vermeulen, 1993
- Diplommatina tweediei Laidlaw, 1949
- Diplommatina tylocheilos Vermeulen, Liew & Schilthuizen, 2015
- Opisthostoma ballorum Vermeulen, 1991
- Opisthostoma brachyacrum brachyacrum Thompson, 1978
- Opisthostoma brachyacrum lambi (Vermeulen, 1991)
- Opisthostoma cryptodon Vermeulen, 1991
- Opisthostoma planiapex Vermeulen, 1991
- Opisthostoma simile Vermeulen, 1994
- Opisthostoma tridens Vermeulen, 1991
- Plectostoma austeni (E. A. Smith, 1894)
- Plectostoma everetti (E. A. Smith, 1893)
- Plectostoma margaretchanae Marzuki, Liew & Mohd-Azlan, 2021
- Plectostoma wallacei busauense (E. A. Smith, 1893)
- Plectostoma wallacei teinostoma (Vermeulen, 1994)
- Plectostoma wallacei wallacei Ancey, 1887

Pupinidae

- Pupina doriae Godwin-Austen, 1889
- Pupina evansi Godwin-Austen, 1889
- Pupina hosei Godwin-Austen, 1889
- Rhaphaulus bombycinus (L. Pfeiffer, 1855)
- Rhaphaulus pfeifferi Issel, 1874

Hydrocenidae

- Georissa anyiensis Khalik, Hendriks, Vermeulen & Schilthuizen, 2018
- Georissa bauensis Khalik, Hendriks, Vermeulen & Schilthuizen, 2018
- Georissa everetti E. A. Smith, 1895
- Georissa hadra Thompson & Dance, 1983
- Georissa hosei Godwin-Austen, 1889
- Georissa hungerfordi Godwin-Austen, 1889
- Georissa kinabatanganensis Khalik, Hendriks, Vermeulen & Schilthuizen, 2018
- Georissa kobelti Gredler, 1902
- Georissa leucococca Vermeulen, Liew & Schilthuizen, 2015
- Georissa muluensis Khalik, Hendriks, Vermeulen & Schilthuizen, 2018
- Georissa nephrostoma Vermeulen, Liew & Schilthuizen, 2015
- Georissa niahensis Godwin-Austen, 1889
- Georissa pyrrhoderma Thompson & Dance, 1983
- Georissa saulae (van Benthem-Jutting, 1966)
- Georissa scalinella (van Benthem-Jutting, 1966)
- Georissa sepulutensis Khalik, Hendriks, Vermeulen & Schilthuizen, 2018
- Georissa silaburensis Khalik, Hendriks, Vermeulen & Schilthuizen, 2018

Camaenidae

- Amphidromus angulatus Fulton, 1896
- Amphidromus psephos Vermeulen, Liew & Schilthuizen, 2015
- Amphidromus cf. similis Pilsbry, 1900
- Bradybaena similaris (Férussac, 1822)
- Chloritis tomentosa (L. Pfeiffer, 1854)
- Kenyirus balingensis Tan, Chan & Foon, 2017
- Kenyirus sheema Foon, Tan & Clements, 2015
- Kenyirus sodhii Clements & Tan, 2012
- Landouria winteriana (L. Pfeiffer, 1842)
- Ganesella acris (Benson, 1859)
- Trachia serpentinitica Vermeulen, Liew & Schilthuizen, 2015

Chronidae

- Kaliella barrakporensis (L. Pfeiffer, 1852)
- Kaliella busauensis (E. A. Smith, 1895)
- Kaliella calculosa (Gould, 1852)
- Kaliella doliolum (L. Pfeiffer, 1846)
- Kaliella microconus (Mousson, 1865)
- Kaliella micula (Mousson, 1857)
- Kaliella platyconus Möllendorff, 1897
- Kaliella scandens (Cox, 1871)
- Platymma tweediei (Tomlin, 1938)

Endodontidae

- Beilania philippinensis (C. Semper, 1874)
- Philalanka jambusanensis Marzuki, Liew & Mohd-Azlan, 2021
- Philalanka kusana (Aldrich, 1889)
- Philalanka moluensis (E. A. Smith, 1893)
- Philalanka tambunanensis Vermeulen, Liew & Schilthuizen, 2015
- Philalanka obscura Vermeulen, Liew & Schilthuizen, 2015
- Philalanka anomphala Vermeulen, Liew & Schilthuizen, 2015
- Philalanka rugulosa Vermeulen, Liew & Schilthuizen, 2015
- Philalanka malimgunung Vermeulen, Liew & Schilthuizen, 2015

Euconulidae

- Kaliella eurytrochus Vermeulen, Liew & Schilthuizen, 2015
- Kaliella sublaxa Vermeulen, Liew & Schilthuizen, 2015
- Kaliella phacomorpha Vermeulen, Liew & Schilthuizen, 2015
- Kaliella punctata Vermeulen, Liew & Schilthuizen, 2015
- Kaliella microsoma Vermeulen, Liew & Schilthuizen, 2015
- Rahula delopleura Vermeulen, Liew & Schilthuizen, 2015

Punctidae

- Paralaoma angusta Vermeulen, Liew & Schilthuizen, 2015
- Paralaoma sarawakensis Marzuki, Liew & Mohd-Azlan, 2021

Charopidae

- Charopa sp. 'argos'

Trochomorphidae

- Trochomorpha trachus Vermeulen, Liew & Schilthuizen, 2015
- Trochomorpha haptoderma Vermeulen, Liew & Schilthuizen, 2015
- Trochomorpha thelecoryphe Vermeulen, Liew & Schilthuizen, 2015
- Geotrochus conicoides (Metcalfe, 1851)
- Geotrochus oedobasis Vermeulen, Liew & Schilthuizen, 2015
- Geotrochus spilokeiria Vermeulen, Liew & Schilthuizen, 2015
- Geotrochus scolops Vermeulen, Liew & Schilthuizen, 2015
- Geotrochus kitteli Vermeulen, Liew & Schilthuizen, 2015
- Geotrochus subscalaris Vermeulen, Liew & Schilthuizen, 2015
- Geotrochus meristorhachis Vermeulen, Liew & Schilthuizen, 2015
- Videna bicolor (Martens, 1864)
- Videna timorensis (Martens, 1867)

Ryssotidae

- Exrhysota brookei (A. Adams & Reeve, 1848)

Helicarionidae

- Microcystis dyakana Godwin-Austen, 1891

Euconulidae

- Rahula raricostulata (E. A. Smith, 1893)

Clausiliidae

- Phaedusa borneensis (L. Pfeiffer, 1854)

Valloniidae

- Ptychopatula dioscoricola (C. B. Adams, 1845)
- Ptychopatula orcella (Stoliczka, 1873)
- Pupisoma moleculina (Van Benthem-Jutting, 1940)
- Pupisoma pulvisculum (Issel, 1874)

Veronicellidae

- Laevicaulis alte (Férussac, 1821) - tropical leatherleaf
- Semperula wallacei (Issel, 1874)
- Valiguna flava (Heynemann, 1885)

Rathouisiidae

- Atopos punctata Collinge 1902

Ariophantidae

- Damayantia carinata Collinge, 1901
- Durgella densestriata Vermeulen, Liew & Schilthuizen, 2015
- Dyakia chlorosoma Vermeulen, Liew & Schilthuizen, 2015
- Hemiplecta densa (A. Adams & Reeve, 1850)
- Macrochlamys infans (L. Pfeiffer, 1854)
- Macrochlamys sainctjohni (Godwin-Austen, 1891)
- Macrochlamys tersa (Issel, 1874)
- Microcystina arabii Marzuki, Liew & Mohd-Azlan, 2021
- Microcystina atoni Marzuki, Liew & Mohd-Azlan, 2021
- Microcystina kilat Marzuki, Liew & Mohd-Azlan, 2021
- Microcystina lirata Marzuki, Liew & Mohd-Azlan, 2021
- Microcystina oswaldbrakeni Marzuki, Liew & Mohd-Azlan, 2021
- Microcystina paripari Marzuki, Liew & Mohd-Azlan, 2021
- Microcystina microrhynchus Vermeulen, Liew & Schilthuizen, 2015
- Microcystina callifera Vermeulen, Liew & Schilthuizen, 2015
- Microcystina striatula Vermeulen, Liew & Schilthuizen, 2015
- Microcystina planiuscula Vermeulen, Liew & Schilthuizen, 2015
- Microcystina physotrochus Vermeulen, Liew & Schilthuizen, 2015
- Microcystina seclusa Godwin-Austen, 1891
- Ibycus rachelae Schilthuizen & Liew, 2008 - ninja slug
- Microparmarion pollonerai Collinge & Godwin Austen, 1895
- Microparmarion simrothi Collinge & Godwin Austen, 1895
- Parmarion martensi Simroth, 1893
- Philippinella moellendorffi (Collinge, 1899)
- Vitrinula glutinosa (Metcalfe, 1851)

Limacidae

- Deroceras laeve (Müller, 1774) - marsh slug

Philomycidae

- Meghimatium striatum (Van Hasselt, 1824)
- Meghimatium uniforme Laidlaw 1937
- Meghimatium pictum (Stoliczka, 1872)

Subulinidae

- Allopeas myrmekophilos Janssen & Witte, 2002
- Curvella hadrotes Vermeulen, Liew & Schilthuizen, 2015

Alycaeidae

- Alycaeus alticola Foon & Liew, 2017
- Alycaeus altispirus Möllendorff, 1902
- Alycaeus balingensis Tomlin, 1948
- Alycaeus carinata Maassen, 2006
- Alycaeus charasensis Foon & Liew, 2017
- Alycaeus clementsi Foon & Liew, 2017
- Alycaeus conformis Fulton, 1902
- Alycaeus costacrassa Foon & Liew, 2017
- Alycaeus expansus Foon & Liew, 2017
- Alycaeus gibbosulus Stoliczka, 1872
- Alycaeus ikanensis Foon & Liew, 2017
- Alycaeus jousseaumei Morgan, 1885
- Alycaeus kapayanensis Morgan, 1885
- Alycaeus kelantanensis Sykes, 1902
- Alycaeus kurauensis Foon & Liew, 2017
- Alycaeus liratulus Preston, 1907
- Alycaeus perakensis Crosse, 1879
- Alycaeus regalis Foon & Liew, 2017
- Alycaeus robeleni Möllendorff, 1894
- Alycaeus selangoriensis Foon & Liew, 2017
- Alycaeus senyumensis Foon & Liew, 2017
- Alycaeus thieroti Morgan, 1885
- Alycaeus virgogravida Foon & Liew, 2017
- Chamalycaeus specus (Godwin-Austen, 1889)
- Pincerna globosa (H. Adams, 1870)
- Stomacosmethis hosei (Godwin-Austen, 1889)
- Stomacosmethis sadongensis (E. A. Smith, 1895)

Gastrocoptidae

- Boysidia megaphonum van Benthem-Jutting, 1950
- Boysidia perigyra van Benthem-Jutting, 1950
- Boysidia salpinx F. G. Thompson & Dance, 1983
- Hypselostoma serpa van Benthem-Jutting, 1950

Dyakiidae

- Dyakia busanensis Godwin-Austen, 1891
- Dyakia subdebilis E. A. Smith, 1895
- Everettia cutteri (H. Adams, 1870)
- Everettia microrhytida Marzuki, Liew & Mohd-Azlan, 2021
- Everettia minuta Marzuki, Liew & Mohd-Azlan, 2021
- Rhinocochlis nasuta (Metcalfe, 1851)
- Quantula striata (Gray, 1834)

Achatinellidae

- Elasmias sundanum (Möllendorff, 1897)

Achatinidae

- Lissachatina fulica (Bowdich, 1822) - giant African land snail
- Allopeas clavulinum (Potiez & Michaud, 1838) - spike awlsnail
- Allopeas gracile (T. Hutton, 1834) - graceful awlsnail
- Opeas didyma (Westerlund, 1883)
- Paropeas achatinaceum (L. Pfeiffer, 1846)

Diapheridae

- Platycochlium sarawakense Laidlaw, 1950
- Sinoennea Kobelt, 1904

Streptaxidae

- Gulella bicolor (T. Hutton, 1834) - two-toned gulella
- Odontartemon balingensis Tomlin, 1948

Succineidae

- Succinea obesa (Martens, 1867)

== See also ==
- List of marine molluscs of Malaysia

Lists of molluscs of surrounding countries:

- List of non-marine molluscs of Thailand
- List of non-marine molluscs of Indonesia
- List of non-marine molluscs of Brunei
- List of non-marine molluscs of Singapore
- List of non-marine molluscs of Vietnam
- List of non-marine molluscs of the Philippines
