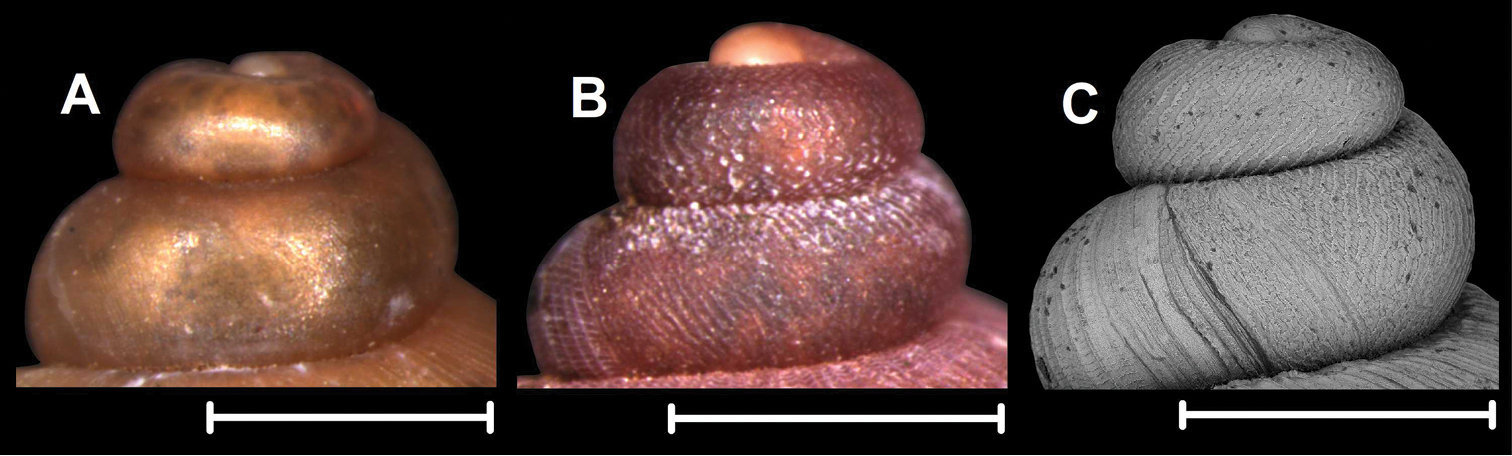
- Protoconch of Alycaeus rolfbrandti (fig. B)

Scientific classification
- Kingdom: Animalia
- Phylum: Mollusca
- Class: Gastropoda
- Subclass: Caenogastropoda
- Order: Architaenioglossa
- Superfamily: Cyclophoroidea
- Family: Alycaeidae
- Genus: Alycaeus
- Species: A. rolfbrandti

Binomial name
- Alycaeus rolfbrandti Maassen, 2006

= Alycaeus rolfbrandti =

Species of gastropod

Alycaeus rolfbrandti is a species of small land snails with a gill and an operculum, terrestrial gastropod mollusks in the family Alycaeidae.

== Description ==
The protoconch of Alycaeus rolfbrandti (a species otherwise similar to the type species, Alycaeus eydouxi) is finely scaly/tuberculated in oblique lines at the end of the protoconch. It is also strongly sculptured (mamillated), and at the end of the protoconch oblique striae can be seen. The protoconch is irregularly ribbed, squamous, the last ca. 0.25 whorl with oblique ribs similar to those of Alycaeus conformis and Alycaeus gibbosulus. The upper part of the spire shows regular, fine, low ribs without spiral striae. The lower part of the spire shows long with dense, lamella-like ribs (very similar to those of Alycaeus eydouxi).

== Distribution ==
This species occurs in central Laos.
