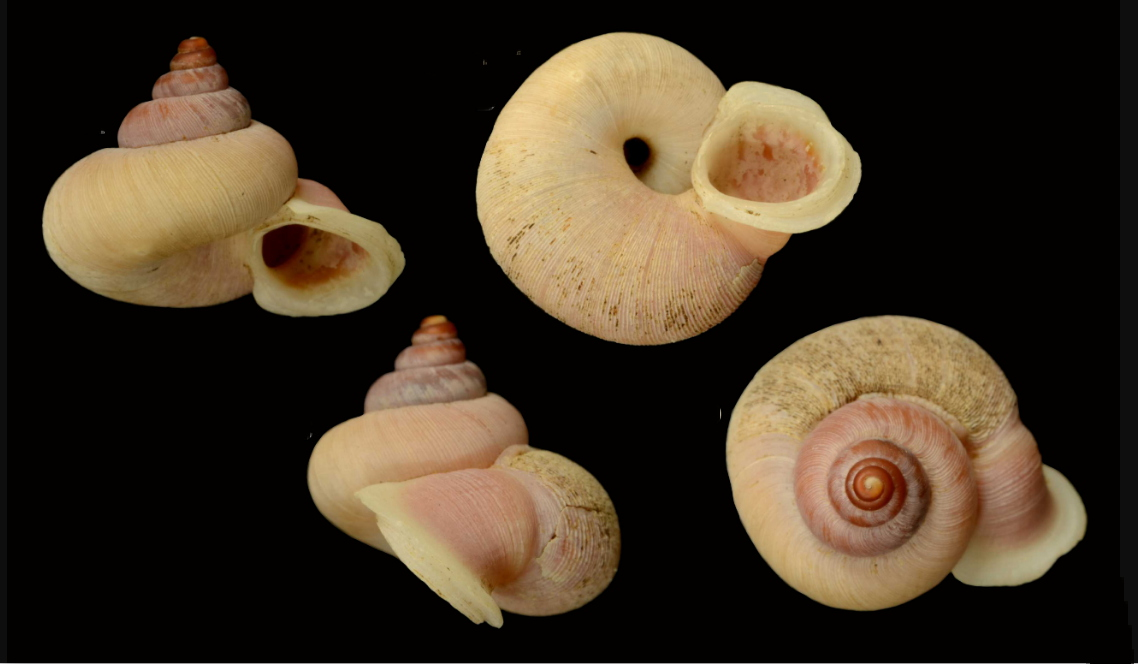
- Shell of Alycaeus goliath (holotype at MNHN, Paris)

Scientific classification
- Kingdom: Animalia
- Phylum: Mollusca
- Class: Gastropoda
- Subclass: Caenogastropoda
- Order: Architaenioglossa
- Superfamily: Cyclophoroidea
- Family: Alycaeidae
- Genus: Alycaeus
- Species: A. goliath

Binomial name
- Alycaeus goliath Páll-Gergely, 2023

= Alycaeus goliath =

Species of gastropod

Alycaeus goliath is a species of small land snails with a gill and an operculum, terrestrial gastropod mollusks in the family Alycaeidae. It was first described in 2023 by the malacologist Barna Páll-Gergely

== Description ==
The shell of Alycaeus goliath is exceptionally large for the family, attaining a width of 13.8–15.2 mm and a height of 11.1–12.0 mm. This makes it the largest known species in the family Alycaeidae. The shell is pinkish, conical, and wider than it is high, with a prominently bulging last whorl.

The shell structure is divided into distinct sections. The protoconch (the embryonic shell) consists of about two whorls and is nearly smooth, with only very fine ribs visible on the last quarter whorl. The teleoconch (the adult shell) comprises three main sections designated R1, R2, and R3. R1 consists of approximately three whorls with a finely reticulated surface pattern formed by weak, dense radial ribs and much weaker spiral striation. R2 and R3 together are slightly longer than half a whorl. R2 features sharp, dense ribs that connect to one another via calcareous projections, forming a distinctive web-like surface. R3 possesses a blunt, low swelling just after a deep but short constriction that separates it from R2.

The aperture (the opening of the shell) is rounded with a slight upper incision. The outer lip is strongly expanded and slightly reflected, while the inner lip is strong, sharp, and protruding, clearly separated from the outer lip in the palatal region. The peristome (the margin of the aperture) is whitish, while the inner side of the aperture is orange. The umbilicus is open, revealing all the whorls. The operculum (the “trapdoor” that seals the shell) is unknown for this species.

== Breathing apparatus ==
Like all Asian members of the family Alycaeidae, Alycaeus goliath possesses a complex breathing apparatus formed by a sutural tube, an externally closed tube lying along the suture behind the aperture, and a system of microscopic tunnels. These tunnels run beneath the radial ribs. These tunnels open to the exterior near the umbilicus. This specialized structure allows gas exchange even when the operculum seals the aperture, protecting the snail from predators and minimizing water loss. The tube is formed “backwards” during shell growth, after the microtunnels have already been created.

== Distribution ==
This species is currently known only from its type locality in south-central Laos, Khammouane province. Approximately 37 km east-northeast of Thakhek and about 4.5 km west-northwest of Mahaxay. The specimens were collected at an altitude of approximately 150 meters, on and under rocks in dry secondary forest, under a cliff facing east, on limestone with clay and black soil in limestone pockets and cave deposits. The species is known to occur together with Alycaeus rolfbrandti, another species in the same family.

== Taxonomy and etymology ==
The specific name goliath refers to the remarkably large size of this species a reference to the biblical giant Goliath. This is the largest species in the family Alycaeidae, followed by Stomacosmethis christae.

Alycaeus goliath can be distinguished from related species such as A. eydouxi by its larger size, more protruding inner peristome, and the web-like structure formed by the R2 ribs. It differs from A. rolfbrandti by its larger shell size and smooth protoconch, whereas A. rolfbrandti has an irregularly ribbed protoconch.
