= Alycaeus himalayae =

Scientific classification
- Kingdom: Animalia
- Phylum: Mollusca
- Class: Gastropoda
- Subclass: Caenogastropoda
- Order: Architaenioglossa
- Superfamily: Cyclophoroidea
- Family: Alycaeidae
- Genus: Alycaeus
- Species: A. himalayae

Binomial name
- Alycaeus himalayae Aravind & Páll-Gergely, 2023

Species of gastropod

Alycaeus himalayae is a species of small land snails with a gill and an operculum, terrestrial gastropod mollusks in the family Alycaeidae.

== Description ==
The length of the shell attains 7.4 mm.

== Distribution ==
This species occurs in Arunachal Pradesh, northeast India.
