= Alycaeus somwangi =

Scientific classification
- Kingdom: Animalia
- Phylum: Mollusca
- Class: Gastropoda
- Subclass: Caenogastropoda
- Order: Architaenioglossa
- Superfamily: Cyclophoroidea
- Family: Alycaeidae
- Genus: Alycaeus
- Species: A. somwangi

Binomial name
- Alycaeus somwangi Dumrongrojwattana & Maassen, 2008

Species of gastropod

Alycaeus somwangi is a species of small land snails with a gill and an operculum, terrestrial gastropod mollusks in the family Alycaeidae.

== Description ==
The width of the shell attains 11 mm.

The protoconch has no spiral striae. The lower part of the spire is very long, with regular, low ribs.

== Distribution ==
This species occurs in Thailand.
