= Alycaeus pyramidalis =

Scientific classification
- Kingdom: Animalia
- Phylum: Mollusca
- Class: Gastropoda
- Subclass: Caenogastropoda
- Order: Architaenioglossa
- Superfamily: Cyclophoroidea
- Family: Alycaeidae
- Genus: Alycaeus
- Species: A. pyramidalis

Binomial name
- Alycaeus pyramidalis W. H. Benson, 1856

Synonyms
- Alycaeus (Alycaeus) pyramidalis W. H. Benson, 1856 (no subgenera are recognized)

Species of gastropod

Alycaeus pyramidalis is a species of small land snails with a gill and an operculum, terrestrial gastropod mollusks in the family Alycaeidae.

== Description ==
The length of the shell attains 10 mm, its diameter 12 mm.

The protoconch has no particular sculpture and is rather matte. The upper spire shows low, irregular growth ridges. The rest of the spire is relatively short, but much longer than typical in Stomacosmethis. The surface is irregularly wrinkled, and possibly ribbed near the suture.

== Distribution ==
This species occurs in Myanmar and Thailand.
