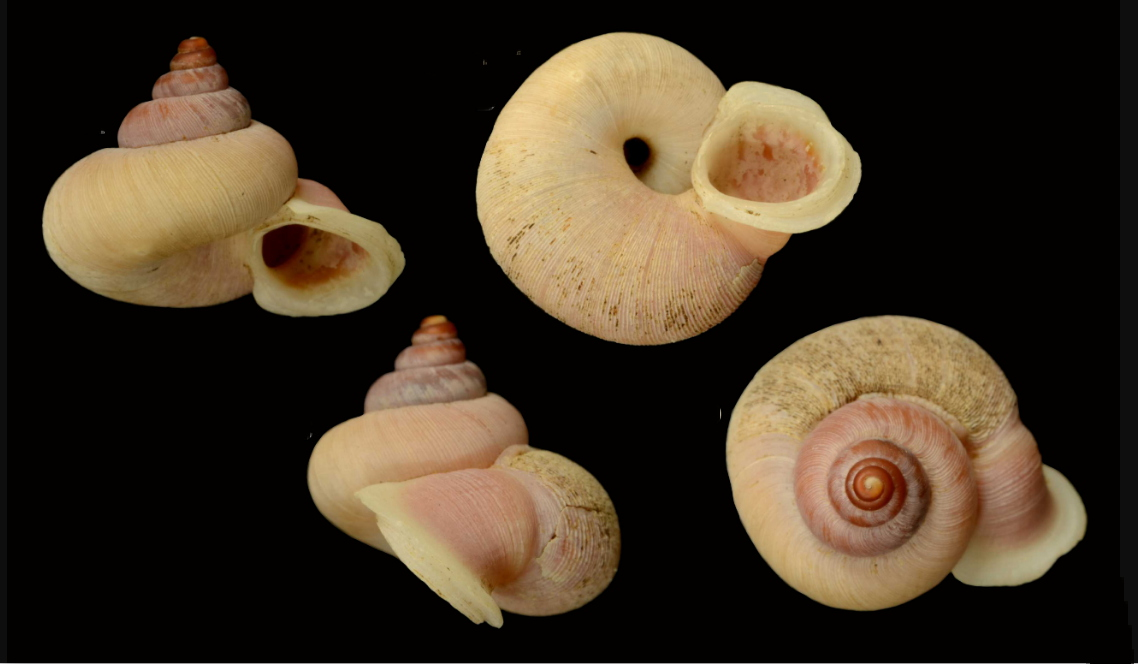
- Shell of Alycaeus goliath (holotype at MNHN, Paris)

Scientific classification
- Kingdom: Animalia
- Phylum: Mollusca
- Class: Gastropoda
- Subclass: Caenogastropoda
- Order: Architaenioglossa
- Superfamily: Cyclophoroidea
- Family: Alycaeidae
- Genus: Alycaeus; J. E. Gray, 1850

Type species
- Cyclostoma gibbum Eydoux, 1838

Synonyms
- Alcaeus [sic] misspelling - incorrect subsequent spelling; Alycaeus (Alycaeus) Gray, 1850· accepted, alternate representation; Alycaeus (Orthalycaeus) L. Pfeiffer, 1876; Orthalycaeus L. Pfeiffer, 1876; Alycoeus [sic] misspelling - incorrect subsequent spelling

= Alycaeus =

Genus of gastropods

Alycaeus is a genus of small land snails with a gill and an operculum, terrestrial gastropod mollusks in the family Alycaeidae.

== Description ==
(Original description) The operculum is horny with multiple whorls. The conical shell has a regular spire. The body whorl is distorted and compressed and significantly contracted before the aperture. The aperture is circular, with a regularly reflexed peristome.

The protoconch sculpture is smooth to obliquely striated. The diameter of the shell varies between 8 mm and 15 mm. The central tooth of the radula consists of five broad cusps with the central cusp blunt.

== Distribution ==
There are nine recognized species of Alycaeus in Peninsular Malaysia.

== Species ==
Species within the genus Alycaeus include:

- Alycaeus conformis Fulton, 1902
- Alycaeus eydouxi Venmans, 1956
- Alycaeus gibbosulus Stoliczka, 1872
- Alycaeus goliath Páll-Gergely, 2023
- Alycaeus himalayae Aravind & Páll-Gergely, 2023
- Alycaeus jousseaumei Morgan, 1885
- Alycaeus pyramidalis W. H. Benson, 1856
- Alycaeus rolfbrandti Maassen, 2006
- Alycaeus somwangi Dumrongrojwattana & Maassen, 2008

Taxon inquirendum

- Alycaeus huberi Thach, 2018 (uncertain: debated synonym)

Synonyms

- Alycaeus alticola Foon & Liew, 2017: synonym of Stomacosmethis kapayanensis alticola (Foon & T.-S. Liew, 2017) (basionym)
- Alycaeus altispirus Möllendorff, 1902: synonym of Stomacosmethis altispirus (Möllendorff, 1902) (unaccepted combination)
- Alycaeus balingensis Tomlin, 1948: synonym of Stomacosmethis balingensis (Tomlin, 1948) (basionym)
- Alycaeus carinata Maassen, 2006: synonym of Stomacosmethis carinatus (Maassen, 2006) (wrong gender agreement of specific epithet)
- Alycaeus charasensis Foon & Liew, 2017: synonym of Stomacosmethis kapayanensis charasensis (Foon & T.-S. Liew, 2017) (basionym)
- Alycaeus clementsi Foon & Liew, 2017: synonym of Stomacosmethis kelantanensis clementsi (Foon & T.-S. Liew, 2017) (basionym)
- Alycaeus (Dioryx) compactus Bavay & Dautzenberg, 1900: synonym of Dioryx compactus (Bavay & Dautzenberg, 1900) (original combination)
- Alycaeus costacrassa Foon & Liew, 2017: synonym of Stomacosmethis kapayanensis costacrassa (Foon & T.-S. Liew, 2017) (basionym)
- Alycaeus expansus Foon & Liew, 2017: synonym of Stomacosmethis kelantanensis expansus (Foon & T.-S. Liew, 2017) (basionym)
- Alycaeus galbanus Godwin-Austen, 1889: synonym of Stomacosmethis galbanus (Godwin-Austen, 1889) (original combination)
- Alycaeus globosus Adams, 1870: synonym of Pincerna globosus (H. Adams, 1871)
- Alycaeus hosei Godwin-Austen, 1889: synonym of Stomacosmethis hosei (Godwin-Austen, 1889)
- [lycaeus ikanensis Foon & Liew, 2017: synonym of Stomacosmethis kapayanensis ikanensis (Foon & T.-S. Liew, 2017)
- Alycaeus kapayanensis Morgan, 1885: synonym of Stomacosmethis kapayanensis (de Morgan, 1885)
- Alycaeus kelantanensis Sykes, 1902: synonym of Stomacosmethis kelantanensis (Sykes, 1902)
- Alycaeus kurauensis Foon & Liew, 2017: synonym of Stomacosmethis kapayanensis kurauensis (Foon & T.-S. Liew, 2017)
- Alycaeus liratulus Preston, 1907: synonym of Pincerna liratulus (Preston, 1907)
- Alycaeus perakensis Crosse, 1879: synonym of Stomacosmethis perakensis (Crosse, 1879)
- Alycaeus regalis Foon & Liew, 2017: synonym of Stomacosmethis regalis (Foon & T.-S. Liew, 2017)
- Alycaues roebeleni Möllendorff, 1894: synonym of Stomacosmethis roebeleni (Möllendorff, 1894)
- Alycaeus selangoriensis Foon & Liew, 2017: synonym of Stomacosmethis kapayanensis selangoriensis (Foon & T.-S. Liew, 2017)
- Alycaeus senyumensis Foon & Liew, 2017: synonym of Stomacosmethis senyumensis (Foon & T.-S. Liew, 2017)
- Alycaeus thieroti Morgan, 1885: synonym of Pincerna thieroti (de Morgan, 1885)
- Alycaeus virgogravida Foon & Liew, 2017: synonym of Stomacosmethis kapayanensis virgogravida (Foon & T.-S. Liew, 2017)
