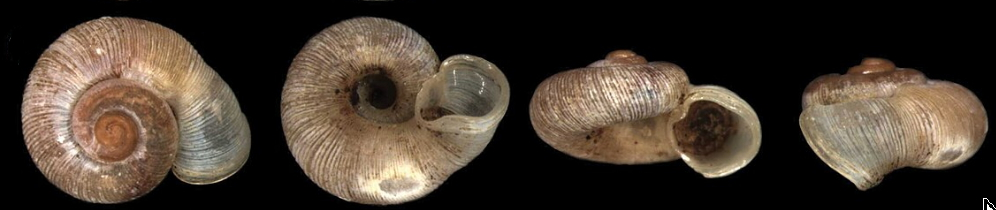
- Shell of Dicharax biexcisus

Conservation status
- Data Deficient (IUCN 2.3)

Scientific classification
- Kingdom: Animalia
- Phylum: Mollusca
- Class: Gastropoda
- Subclass: Caenogastropoda
- Order: Architaenioglossa
- Family: Alycaeidae
- Genus: Dicharax
- Species: D. biexcisus

Binomial name
- Dicharax biexcisus (H. A. Pilsbry, 1902)

Synonyms
- List: Alycaeus biexcisus Pilsbry, 1902; Chamalycaeus (Cipangocharax) biexcisus (Pilsbry, 1902); Chamalycaeus biexcisus (Pilsbry, 1902); Cipangocharax biexcisus (H. A. Pilsbry, 1902)

= Dicharax biexcisus =

Species of gastropod

Dicharax biexcisus is a species of small tropical land snail with an operculum, a terrestrial gastropod mollusk in the family Alycaeidae.

This species is found throughout the Indo-Pacific. it was originally named by Henry Augustus Pilsbry as Alycaeus (Chamalycaeus) biexcisus.
