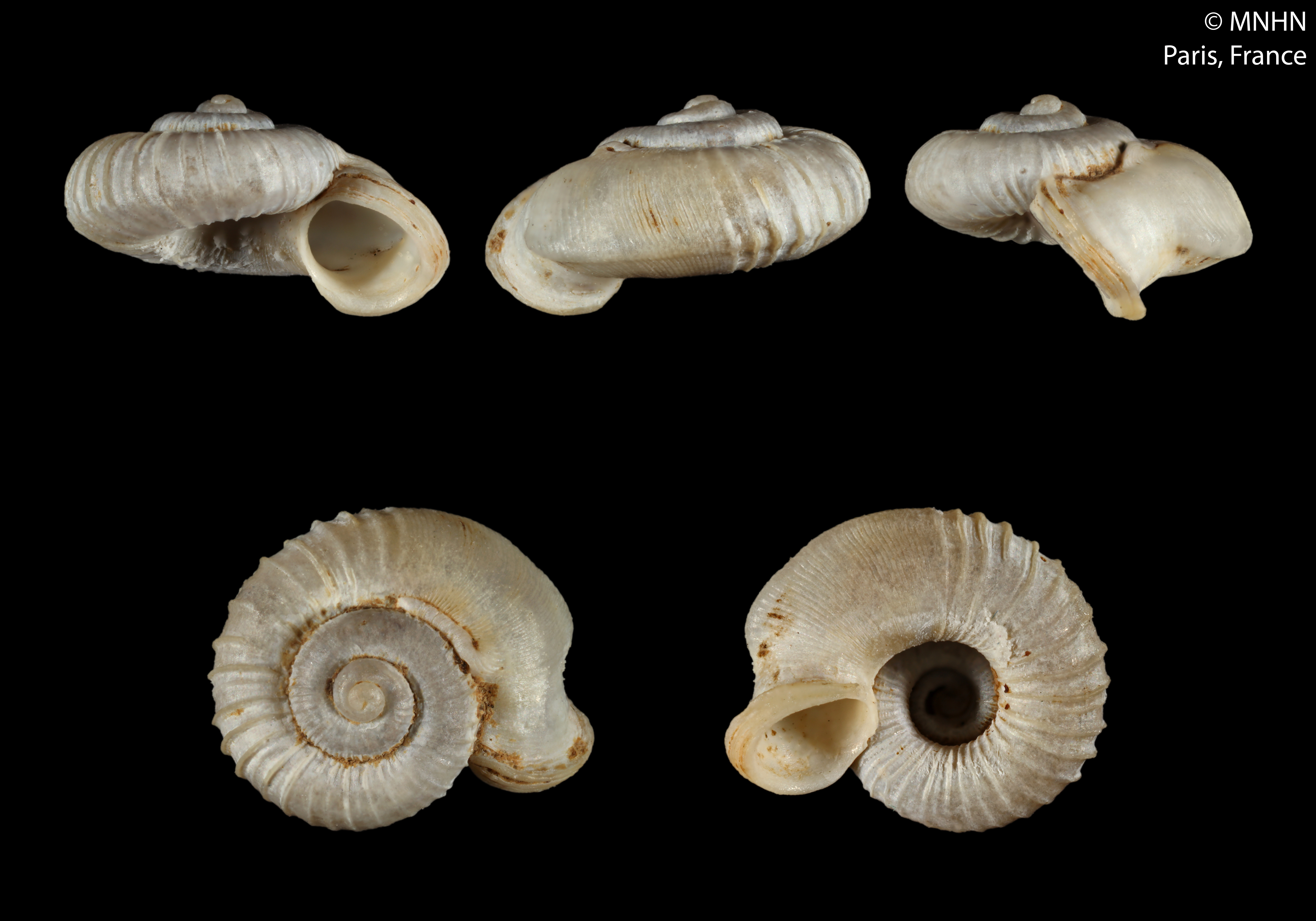
- Shell of Metalycaeus ibex (holotype at MNHN, Paris)

Scientific classification
- Kingdom: Animalia
- Phylum: Mollusca
- Class: Gastropoda
- Subclass: Caenogastropoda
- Order: Architaenioglossa
- Superfamily: Cyclophoroidea
- Family: Alycaeidae
- Genus: Metalycaeus; Pilsbry, 1900

Synonyms
- Alycaeus (Metalycaeus) Pilsbry, 1900 (original rank); Alycaeus (Raptomphalus) Godwin-Austen, 1914 (junior synonym); Chamalycaeus (Metalycaeus) Pilsbry, 1900 (unaccepted rank); Chamalycaeus (Raptomphalus) Godwin-Austen, 1914 (junior synonym)

= Metalycaeus =

Genus of gastropods

Metalycaeus is a genus of tropical land snails with an operculum, terrestrial gastropod mollusks in the family Alycaeidae.

== Species ==
- Metalycaeus aborensis (Godwin-Austen, 1914)
- Metalycaeus anas Páll-Gergely & A. Reischütz, 2021
- Metalycaeus aries Páll-Gergely & Auffenberg, 2021
- Metalycaeus awalycaeoides Páll-Gergely & Hunyadi, 2017
- Metalycaeus beddomei (Godwin-Austen, 1914)
- Metalycaeus bhutanensis (Godwin-Austen, 1914)
- Metalycaeus bicarinatus Páll-Gergely & Hunyadi, 2021
- Metalycaeus brahma (Godwin-Austen, 1886)
- Metalycaeus burtii (Godwin-Austen, 1874)
- Metalycaeus caroli (O. Semper, 1862)
- Metalycaeus crenulatus (Benson, 1859)
- Metalycaeus cyphogyrus (Quadras & Möllendorff, 1895)
- Metalycaeus dikrangensis (Godwin-Austen, 1914)
- Metalycaeus distinctus (Godwin-Austen, 1893)
- Metalycaeus godwinausteni Páll-Gergely, 2020
- Metalycaeus heudei (Bavay & Dautzenberg, 1900)
- Metalycaeus hirasei (Pilsbry, 1900)
- Metalycaeus hungerfordianus (G. Nevill, 1881)
- Metalycaeus ibex Páll-Gergely & Hunyadi, 2017
- Metalycaeus inflatus (Godwin-Austen, 1874)
- Metalycaeus kamakiaensis (Godwin-Austen, 1914)
- Metalycaeus laevis (Pilsbry & Y. Hirase, 1909)
- Metalycaeus laosensis Páll-Gergely, 2017
- Metalycaeus latecostatus (Möllendorff, 1882)
- Metalycaeus libonensis (D.-N. Chen, D.-H. Li & T.-C. Luo, 2003)
- Metalycaeus lohitensis (Godwin-Austen, 1914)
- Metalycaeus luyorensis (Godwin-Austen, 1914)
- Metalycaeus macgregori (Godwin-Austen, 1914)
- Metalycaeus magnificus (Godwin-Austen, 1914)
- Metalycaeus minatoi Páll-Gergely, 2017
- Metalycaeus muciferus (Heude, 1885)
- Metalycaeus mundulus (Godwin-Austen, 1914)
- Metalycaeus nipponensis (Reinhardt, 1877)
- Metalycaeus oakesi (Godwin-Austen, 1914)
- Metalycaeus oharai Páll-Gergely & Hunyadi, 2017
- Metalycaeus okuboi Páll-Gergely & Hunyadi, 2017
- Metalycaeus panggianus (Godwin-Austen, 1914)
- Metalycaeus physis (Benson, 1859)
- Metalycaeus polygonoma (W. T. Blanford, 1862)
- Metalycaeus prosectus (Benson, 1857)
- Metalycaeus pygmachos Páll-Gergely & Hunyadi, 2021
- Metalycaeus quadrasi (Möllendorff, 1895)
- Metalycaeus rathouisianus (Heude, 1882)
- Metalycaeus rotundatus (Godwin-Austen, 1914)
- Metalycaeus rubinus (Godwin-Austen, 1893)
- Metalycaeus rugosus (Godwin-Austen, 1914)
- Metalycaeus satsumanus (Pilsbry, 1902)
- Metalycaeus semperi Páll-Gergely & Auffenberg, 2019
- Metalycaeus sibbumensis (Godwin-Austen, 1914)
- Metalycaeus sinensis (Heude, 1882)
- Metalycaeus stylifer (Benson, 1857)
- Metalycaeus subinflatus (Godwin-Austen, 1914)
- Metalycaeus suhajdai Páll-Gergely, 2020
- Metalycaeus teriaensis (Godwin-Austen, 1914)
- Metalycaeus tomotrema (Möllendorff, 1887)
- Metalycaeus toruputuensis (Godwin-Austen, 1914)
- Metalycaeus varius (Pilsbry & Y. Hirase, 1905)
- Metalycaeus vesica (Godwin-Austen, 1914)
- Metalycaeus vinctus (Pilsbry, 1902)
- Metalycaeus yamneyensis (Godwin-Austen, 1914)
- Metalycaeus zayuensis (W.-H. Zhang, W.-H. Chen & W.-H. Zhou, 2008)

; Species brought into synonymy:

- Metalycaeus elevatus (Heude, 1886): synonym of Dicharax elevatus (Heude, 1886) (unaccepted combination)
- Metalycaeus kengtungensis (Godwin-Austen, 1914): synonym of Metalycaeus heudei (Bavay & Dautzenberg, 1900) (junior synonym)
