= Dicharax kiuchii =

Conservation status
- Data Deficient (IUCN 2.3)

Scientific classification
- Kingdom: Animalia
- Phylum: Mollusca
- Class: Gastropoda
- Subclass: Caenogastropoda
- Order: Architaenioglossa
- Family: Alycaeidae
- Genus: Dicharax
- Species: D. kiuchii

Binomial name
- Dicharax kiuchii (Minato & Abe, 1982)

Synonyms
- Cipangocharax kiuchii Minato & Abe, 1982

Species of gastropod

Dicharax kiuchii is a species of small tropical land snail with an operculum, a terrestrial gastropod mollusk in the family Alycaeidae.

This species is endemic to the limestone region of Tokushima-ken, Japan.
