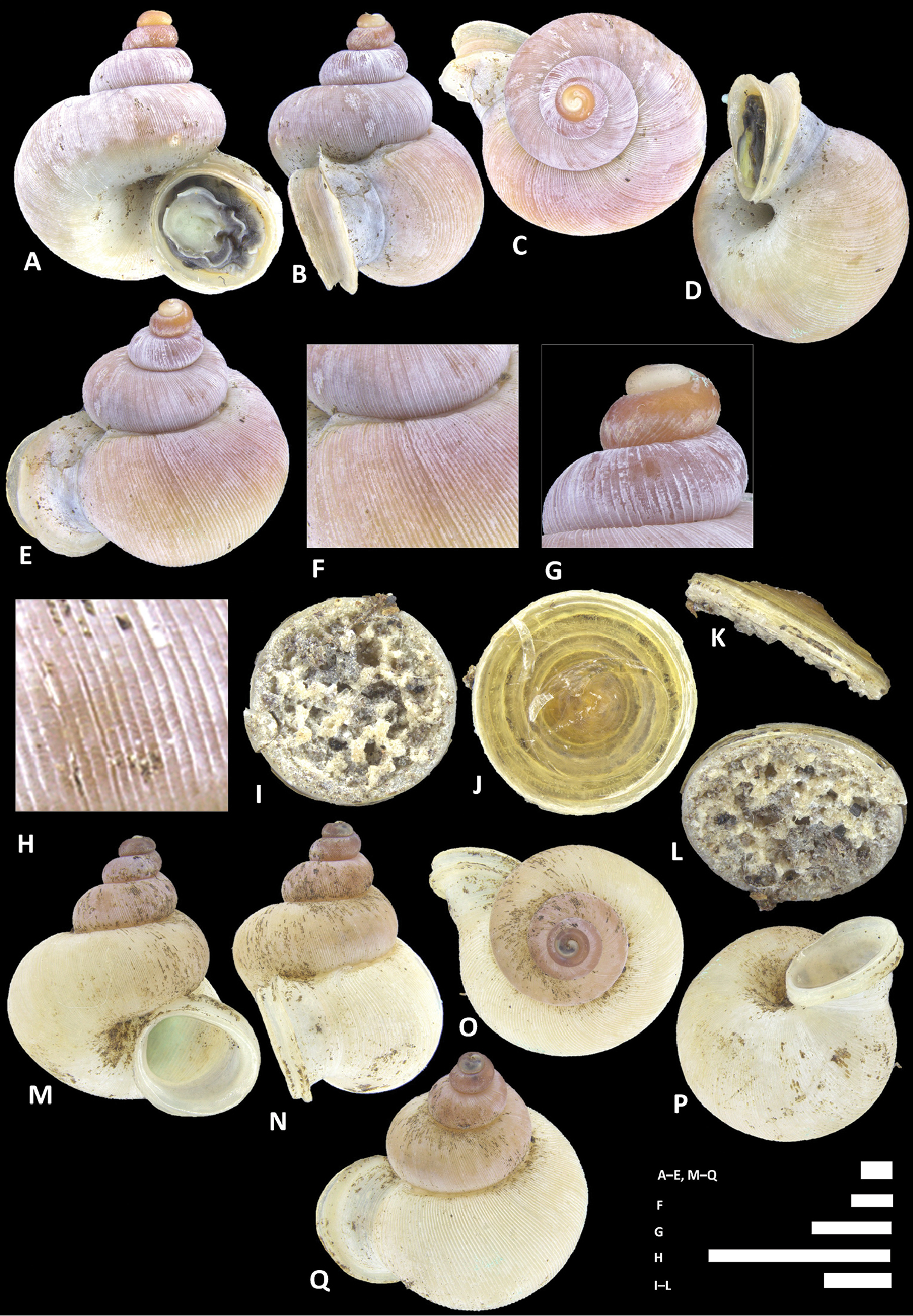
- Shell of Alycaeus gibbosulus

Scientific classification
- Kingdom: Animalia
- Phylum: Mollusca
- Class: Gastropoda
- Subclass: Caenogastropoda
- Order: Architaenioglossa
- Superfamily: Cyclophoroidea
- Family: Alycaeidae
- Genus: Alycaeus
- Species: A. gibbosulus

Binomial name
- Alycaeus gibbosulus Stoliczka, 1872

Synonyms
- Alycaeus (Alycaeus) gibbosulus Stoliczka, 1872 (no subgenera are recognized); Alycaeus (Orthalycaeus) gibbosulus Stoliczka, 1872 (subgenus is a synonym); Alycaeus chaperi de Morgan, 1885

= Alycaeus gibbosulus =

Species of gastropod

Alycaeus gibbosulus is a species of small land snails with a gill and an operculum, terrestrial gastropod mollusks in the family Alycaeidae.

== Description ==
The length of the shell attains 10 mm., its diameter 7 mm.

(Original description in Latin) The shell is turreted with a pronounced gibbosity and is narrowly umbilicated. It has a reddish-violet hue, with the body whorl becoming paler and yellowish, while the apex is whitish. The five whorls are highly convex and joined by a deep, simple suture. The first whorl is smooth, while the next three are densely covered with fine transverse ribs and spiral striations. The body whorl is inflated and more distinctly ribbed. Near the aperture, it is briefly but strongly constricted, slightly smooth, barely deflected, and fitted with a thin tube about two to three millimeters long, which is sometimes almost fully immersed.

The aperture is circular and moderately wide, surrounded by a simple, slightly expanded margin in young specimens, and bilabiate in adults. The inner lip extends outward, forming a tubiform, thickened structure, while the outer lip is dilated and thin. The operculum is solid, with a slightly convex, horny inner surface, submammillate at the center, and multi-spiral, featuring a transverse oval and eccentric muscular impression. The outer surface is calcareous, slightly concave, and irregularly wrinkled.

Characteristics: The protoconch shows oblique striae. The broad central tooth of the radula contains five cusps with the central cusp blunt. This species is presumably closely related to Alycaeus conformis, due to the similarity in the protoconch sculpture.

The ovarium of the living specimen is wide with pointed anterior and blunt posterior end. The bursa copulatrix large, extends beyond ovarium posteriorly, opens at middle part of ovarium near its base, bursa has a thickened posterior portion. The seminal receptacle is small and oval.

== Distribution ==
This species occurs in Peninsular Malaysia.
