= Chamalycaeus yanoshigehumii =

Conservation status
- Data Deficient (IUCN 2.3)

Scientific classification
- Kingdom: Animalia
- Phylum: Mollusca
- Class: Gastropoda
- Subclass: Caenogastropoda
- Order: Architaenioglossa
- Family: Alycaeidae
- Genus: Chamalycaeus
- Species: C. yanoshigehumii

Binomial name
- Chamalycaeus yanoshigehumii Minato, 1987

Species of gastropod

Chamalycaeus yanoshigehumii is a species of tropical land snail with an operculum, a terrestrial gastropod mollusks in the family Alycaeidae.

This species is endemic to Japan.
