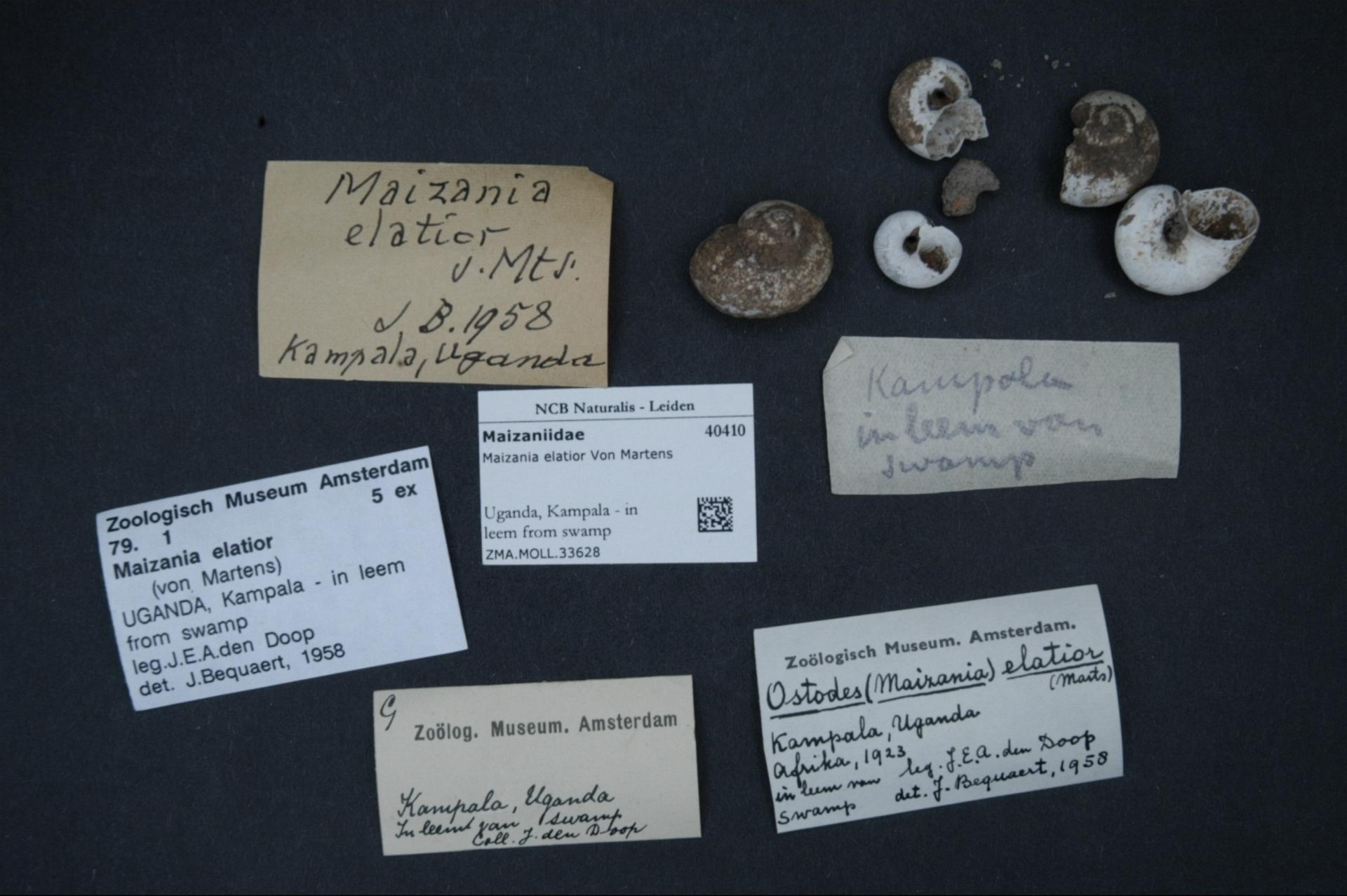

Scientific classification
- Kingdom: Animalia
- Phylum: Mollusca
- Class: Gastropoda
- Subclass: Caenogastropoda
- Order: Architaenioglossa
- Family: Maizaniidae
- Genus: Maizania
- Species: M. elatior

Binomial name
- Maizania elatior (von Martens, 1892)

= Maizania elatior =

Species of gastropod

Maizania elatior is a species of gastropod belonging to the family Maizaniidae.

The species is found in Africa.
