= Dicharax okamurai =

Conservation status
- Data Deficient (IUCN 2.3)

Scientific classification
- Kingdom: Animalia
- Phylum: Mollusca
- Class: Gastropoda
- Subclass: Caenogastropoda
- Order: Architaenioglossa
- Family: Alycaeidae
- Genus: Dicharax
- Species: D. okamurai

Binomial name
- Dicharax okamurai (M. Azuma, 1980)

Synonyms
- List: Awalycaeus okamurai M. Azuma, 1980; Chamalycaeus (Cipangocharax) okamurai (M. Azuma, 1980); Chamalycaeus okamurai (M. Azuma, 1980); Cipangocharax okamurai (M. Azuma, 1980)

Species of gastropod

Dicharax okamurai is a species of small tropical land snail with an operculum, a terrestrial gastropod mollusk in the family Alycaeidae.

This species is endemic to Japan.
