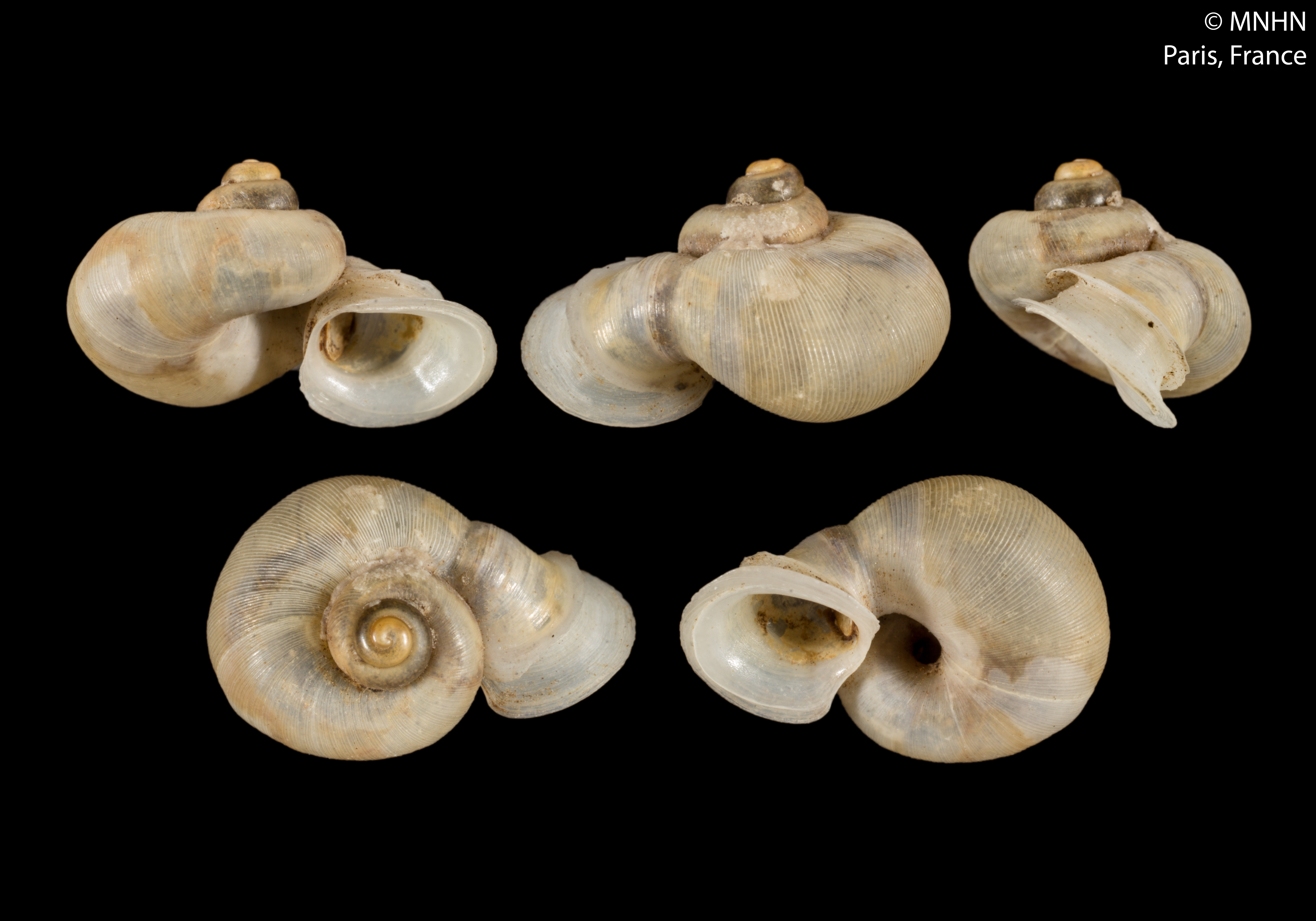
- Shell of Alycaeus jousseaumei (syntype at MNHN, Paris)

Scientific classification
- Domain: Eukaryota
- Kingdom: Animalia
- Phylum: Mollusca
- Class: Gastropoda
- Subclass: Caenogastropoda
- Order: Architaenioglossa
- Superfamily: Cyclophoroidea
- Family: Alycaeidae
- Genus: Alycaeus
- Species: A. jousseaumei

Binomial name
- Alycaeus jousseaumei de Morgan, 1885

Synonyms
- Alycaeus (Chamalycaeus) jousseaumei de Morgan, 1885 (no subgenera are recognized); Chamalycaeus jousseaumei (de Morgan, 1885) (unaccepted combination)

= Alycaeus jousseaumei =

Species of gastropod

Alycaeus jousseaumei is a species of small land snails with a gill and an operculum, terrestrial gastropod mollusks in the family Alycaeidae.

== Description ==
The length of the shell attains 6 mm, its diameter between 11 mm and 15 mm.

(Original description in French) The white shell is perforated and slightly depressed, with the upper whorls and protoconch distinctly elevated. The convex whorls feature a deep suture. The body whorl is notably bulging and narrows sharply just above the circular aperture. Delicate ornamentation and striations run parallel to the growth lines across the whorls. A ridge forms just above the constriction of the body whorl, filling the suture cavity to a variable extent depending on the shell's age. The peristome is double and reflexed, shaped like a horseshoe with its concave side facing the umbilicus. The operculum is horny, multi-whorled, circular and concave on the outside, with a central nucleus protruding internally.

== Distribution ==
This species occurs in Peninsular Malaysia.
