= Dicharax akioi =

Conservation status
- Data Deficient (IUCN 2.3)

Scientific classification
- Kingdom: Animalia
- Phylum: Mollusca
- Class: Gastropoda
- Subclass: Caenogastropoda
- Order: Architaenioglossa
- Family: Alycaeidae
- Genus: Dicharax
- Species: D. akioi

Binomial name
- Dicharax akioi (Kuroda & Abe, 1980)

Synonyms
- Chamalycaeus (Cipangocharax) akioi (Kuroda & Abe, 1980); Chamalycaeus akioi (Kuroda & Abe, 1980); Cipangocharax akioi Kuroda & Abe, 1980

Species of gastropod

Dicharax akioi is a species of land snail in the family Alycaeidae. It has an operculum, and is a gastropod mollusk .
