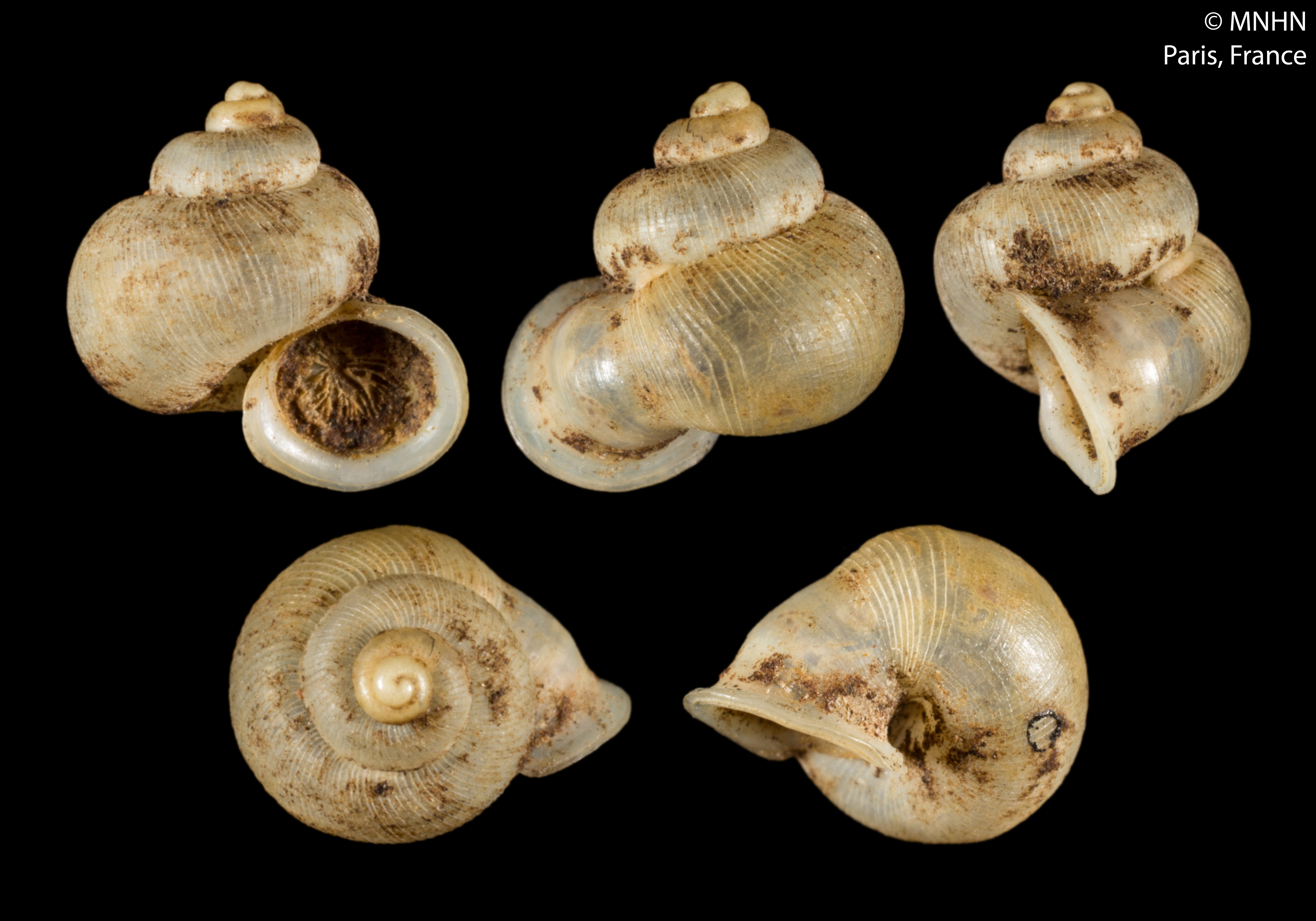
- Shell of Pincerna thieroti (syntype at MNHN, Paris)

Scientific classification
- Kingdom: Animalia
- Phylum: Mollusca
- Class: Gastropoda
- Subclass: Caenogastropoda
- Order: Architaenioglossa
- Superfamily: Cyclophoroidea
- Family: Alycaeidae
- Genus: Pincerna; Preston, 1907

Type species
- Alycaeus (Pincerna) liratula Preston, 1907

Synonyms
- Alycaeus (Cycloryx) Godwin-Austen, 1914; Alycaeus (Pincerna) Preston, 1907 (original rank); Cycloryx Godwin-Austen, 1914

= Pincerna =

Genus of gastropods

Pincerna is a genus of air-breathing land snails in the family Alycaeidae.

== General characteristics ==
(Original description) The shell is alycaeiform. The operculum is horny, being convex below and concave above, and it bears a hollow protuberance in the center of its upper surface. This protuberance is shaped like a circular cup, the margin of which is slightly reflexed outwards.

== Species ==
- Pincerna acroptychia Páll-Gergely, 2023
- Pincerna anceyi (J. Mabille, 1887)
- Pincerna costulosus (Bavay & Dautzenberg, 1912)
- Pincerna crenilabris (Möllendorff, 1897)
- Pincerna globosus (H. Adams, 1871)
- Pincerna liratula (Preston, 1907)
- Pincerna maolanensis (T.-C. Luo, W.-H. Zhang & W.-C. Zhou, 2009)
- Pincerna mouhoti (L. Pfeiffer, 1863)
- Pincerna thieroti (de Morgan, 1885)
- Pincerna vanbuensis (Bavay & Dautzenberg, 1900)
- Pincerna viginticostatus Páll-Gergely, 2023
- Pincerna yaanensis Z.-G. Chen, 2022
- Pincerna yanseni Páll-Gergely, 2017

Synonyms

- Pincerna bembex (Benson, 1859): synonym of Cycloryx bembex (W. H. Benson, 1859) (superseded combination)
- Pincerna burrailensis (Godwin-Austen, 1914): synonym of Cycloryx burrailensis (Godwin-Austen, 1914) (unaccepted > superseded combination)
- Pincerna constricta (Benson, 1851): synonym of Cycloryx constrictus (W. H. Benson, 1851) (superseded combination)
- Pincerna costata (Godwin-Austen, 1914): synonym of Cycloryx costatus (Godwin-Austen, 1914) (unaccepted > superseded combination)
- Pincerna difficilis (Godwin-Austen, 1914): synonym of Cycloryx graphicus (Blanford, 1862) (unaccepted > junior subjective synonym)
- Pincerna elegans (Godwin-Austen, 1914): synonym of Cycloryx elegans (Godwin-Austen, 1914) (unaccepted > superseded combination)
- Pincerna granum (Godwin-Austen, 1893): synonym of Cycloryx granum (Godwin-Austen, 1893) (superseded combination)
- Pincerna graphiaria (Godwin-Austen, 1914): synonym of Pincerna graphiarius (Godwin-Austen, 1914) : synonym of Cycloryx margarita (Theobald, 1874) (incorrect grammatical agreement of specific epithet)
- Pincerna graphica (W. T. Blanford, 1862): synonym of Cycloryx graphicus (Blanford, 1862) (incorrect grammatical agreement of specific epithet)
- Pincerna khunhoensis (Godwin-Austen, 1914): synonym of Cycloryx elegans (Godwin-Austen, 1914) (unaccepted > junior subjective synonym)
- Pincerna major (Godwin-Austen, 1893): synonym of Cycloryx major (Godwin-Austen, 1893) (superseded combination)
- Pincerna margarita (Theobald, 1874): synonym of Cycloryx margarita (Theobald, 1874) (superseded combination)
- Pincerna multicostulata (Godwin-Austen, 1914): synonym of Cycloryx granum (Godwin-Austen, 1893) (unaccepted > junior subjective synonym)
- Pincerna otiphorus (Benson, 1859): synonym of Cycloryx otiphorus (W. H. Benson, 1859) (superseded combination)
- Pincerna paucicostata (Godwin-Austen, 1914): synonym of Cycloryx paucicostatus (Godwin-Austen, 1914) (unaccepted > superseded combination)
- Pincerna summa (Godwin-Austen, 1914): synonym of Cycloryx otiphorus (W. H. Benson, 1859) (junior subjective synonym)
- Pincerna tenella (Godwin-Austen, 1914): synonym of Pincerna tenellus (Godwin-Austen, 1914): synonym of Cycloryx tenellus (Godwin-Austen, 1914) (incorrect grammatical agreement of specific epithet)
- Pincerna thompsoni (Godwin-Austen, 1914): synonym of Cycloryx major (Godwin-Austen, 1893) (junior objective synonym)
- Pincerna vallis Z.-Y. Chen & M. Wu, 2020: synonym of Pincerna costulosus (Bavay & Dautzenberg, 1912) (unaccepted > junior subjective synonym)
