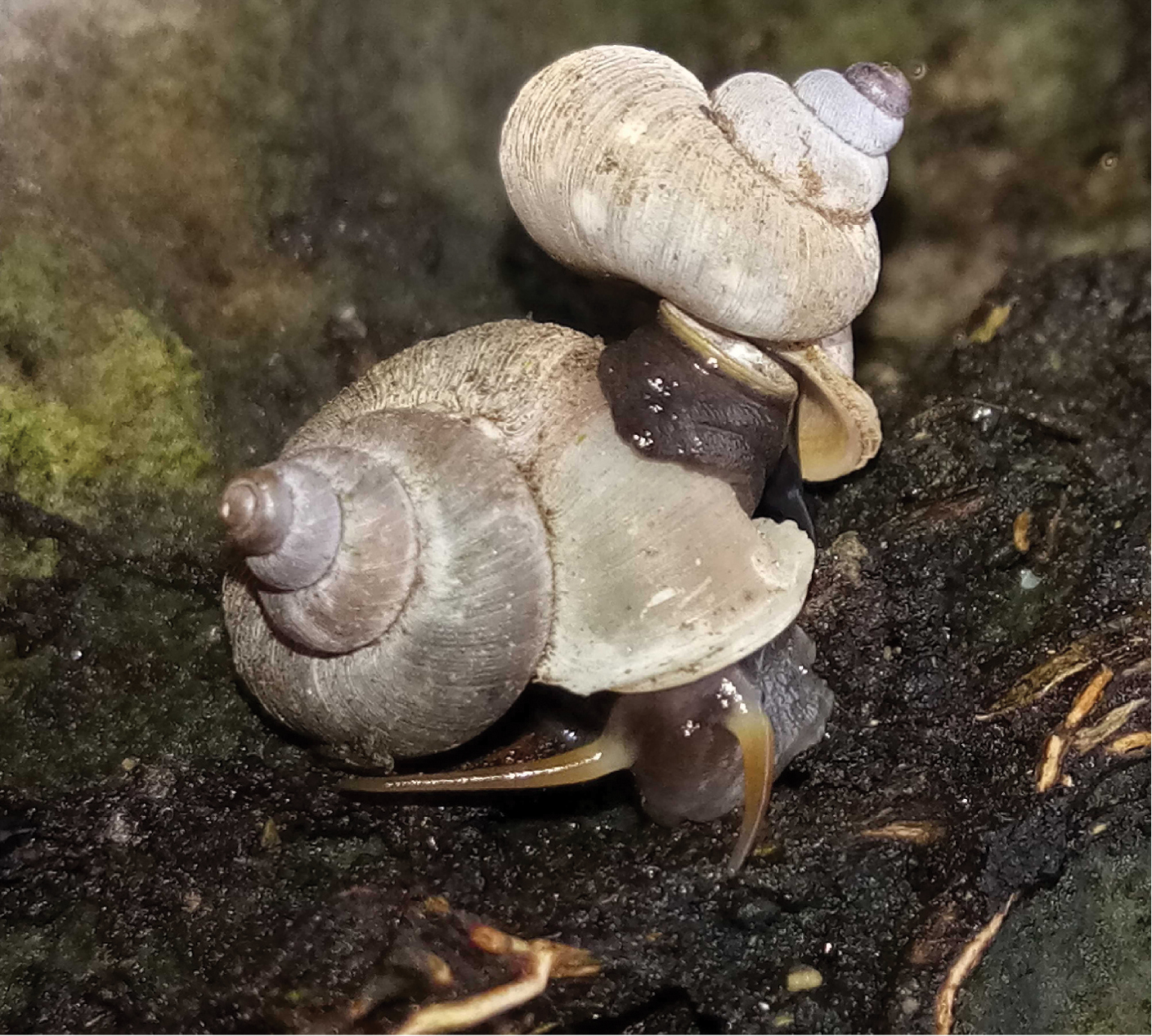
- Two live specimens of Alycaeus eydouxi

Scientific classification
- Kingdom: Animalia
- Phylum: Mollusca
- Class: Gastropoda
- Subclass: Caenogastropoda
- Order: Architaenioglossa
- Superfamily: Cyclophoroidea
- Family: Alycaeidae
- Genus: Alycaeus
- Species: A. eydouxi

Binomial name
- Alycaeus eydouxi Venmans, 1956

Synonyms
- Alycaeus (Alycaeus) gibbus (Eydoux, 1838) (senior homonym of Cyclostoma gibbum Draparnaud, 1805); Alycaeus (Orthalycaeus) gibbus (Eydoux, 1838); Cyclostoma gibbum Eydoux, 1838 (invalid: junior homonym of C. gibbum Draparnaud, 1805; Alycaeus eydouxi is a replacement name)

= Alycaeus eydouxi =

Species of gastropod

Alycaeus eydouxi is a species of small land snails with a gill and an operculum, terrestrial gastropod mollusks in the family Alycaeidae.

== Description ==
Protoconch matte, without spiral lines. The region from the beginning of the teleoconch to the beginning of the differently ribbed region where the sutural tube lies, consists of fine, dense, rather regular ribs with weak spiral striation; the next region of the shell extending to the constriction is long, with dense, lamellae-like, elevated ribs, which are most elevated closer to the suture. Below the ribs, the microtunnels are visible as narrow light bands between the darker, thicker stripes (visible where there are weathered areas of the shell).

== Distribution ==
This species occurs in Vietnam.
