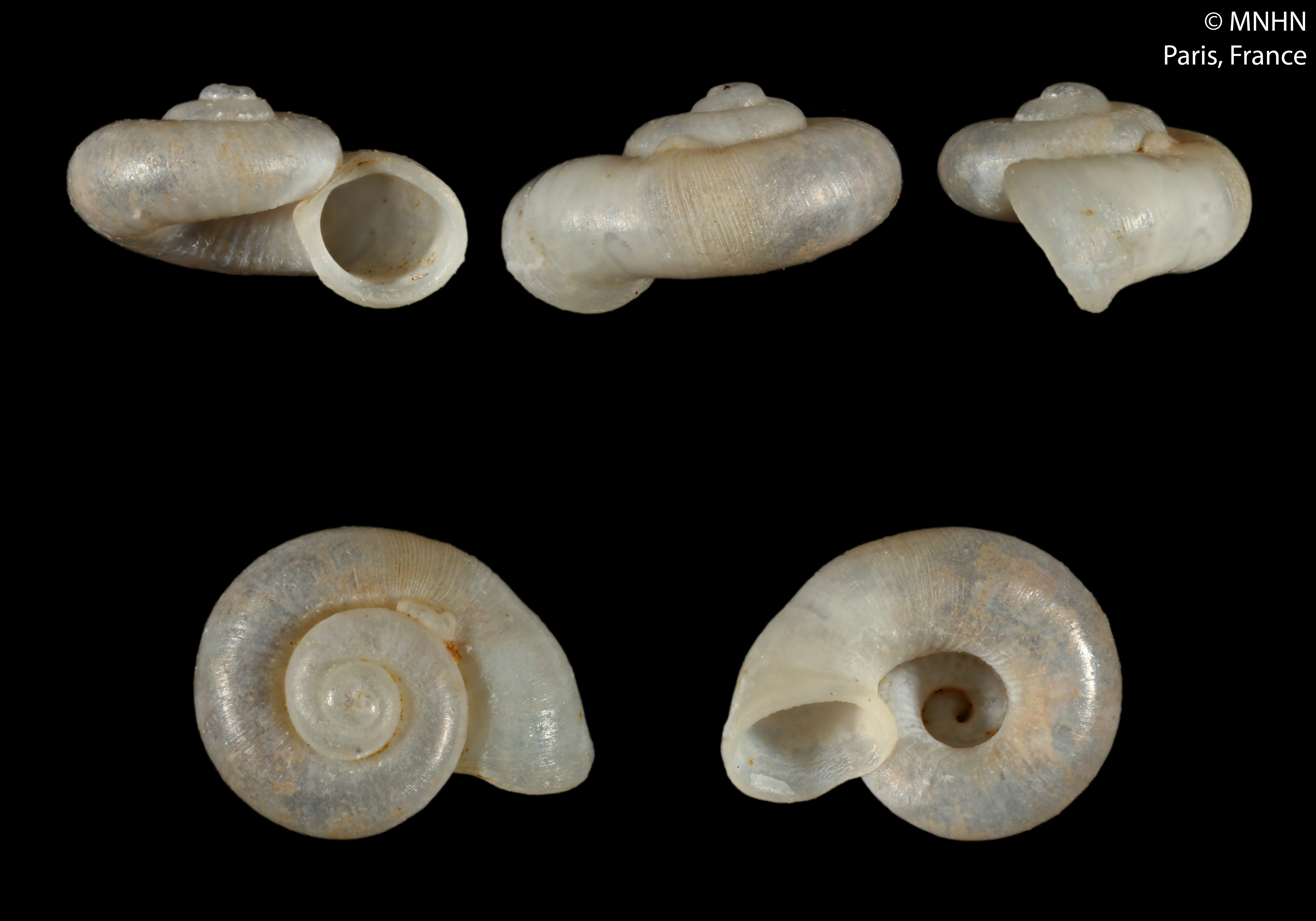
- Shell of Dicharax abdoui (holotype at MNHN, Paris)

Scientific classification
- Kingdom: Animalia
- Phylum: Mollusca
- Class: Gastropoda
- Subclass: Caenogastropoda
- Order: Architaenioglossa
- Superfamily: Cyclophoroidea
- Family: Alycaeidae
- Genus: Dicharax; Kobelt & Möllendorff, 1900

Type species
- Alycaeus hebes Benson, 1857

Synonyms
- List: Alycaeus (Charax) Benson, 1859; Alycaeus (Dicharax) Kobelt & Möllendorff, 1900; Awalycaeus Kuroda, 1951; Chamalycaeus (Cipangocharax) Kuroda, 1943; Chamalycaeus (Dicharax) Kobelt & Möllendorff, 1900; Chamalycaeus (Sigmacharax) Kuroda, 1943; Cipangocharax Kuroda, 1943

= Dicharax =

Genus of gastropods

Dicharax is a genus of air-breathing land snails, terrestrial pulmonate gastropod mollusks in the family Alycaeidae.

== Species ==
Species within the genus Dicharax include:

- Dicharax abdoui Páll-Gergely, 2017
- Dicharax abei (Kuroda, 1951)
- Dicharax admirandus Páll-Gergely & Auffenberg, 2021
- Dicharax akhaensis (Godwin-Austen, 1914)
- Dicharax akioi (Kuroda & Abe, 1980)
- Dicharax akiratadai (Minato, 1982)
- Dicharax alticola Páll-Gergely & Hunyadi, 2017
- Dicharax ananensis (Yano, Akira & H. Matsuda, 2013)
- Dicharax anonymus (Godwin-Austen, 1914)
- Dicharax anthostoma (Möllendorff, 1885)
- Dicharax asaluensis (Godwin-Austen, 1914)
- Dicharax ataranensis (Godwin-Austen, 1914)
- Dicharax avae (W. T. Blanford, 1863)
- Dicharax barowliensis (Godwin-Austen, 1914)
- Dicharax bawai Aravind & Páll-Gergely, 2018
- Dicharax bicrenatus (Godwin-Austen, 1874)
- Dicharax biexcisus (Pilsbry, 1902)
- Dicharax bifrons (Theobald, 1870)
- Dicharax birugosus (Godwin-Austen, 1893)
- Dicharax bison Páll-Gergely & Hunyadi, 2017
- Dicharax blanfordi (Godwin-Austen, 1914)
- Dicharax borealis Jirapatrasilp & Páll-Gergely, 2021
- Dicharax burchi Jirapatrasilp & Páll-Gergely, 2021
- Dicharax burroiensis (Godwin-Austen, 1914)
- Dicharax candrakirana Nurinsiyah & Hausdorf, 2017
- Dicharax caudapiscis Páll-Gergely & Hunyadi, 2018
- Dicharax chennelli (Godwin-Austen, 1886)
- Dicharax conicus (Godwin-Austen, 1871)
- Dicharax crassicollis (van Benthem Jutting, 1959)
- Dicharax crenatus (Godwin-Austen, 1871)
- Dicharax crispatus (Godwin-Austen, 1871)
- Dicharax cristatus (Möllendorff, 1886)
- Dicharax cucullatus (Theobald, 1870)
- Dicharax cyclophoroides (Pilsbry & Y. Hirase, 1909)
- Dicharax cyclostoma Páll-Gergely, 2021
- Dicharax daflaensis (Godwin-Austen, 1876)
- Dicharax dalingensis (Godwin-Austen, 1914)
- Dicharax damsangensis (Godwin-Austen, 1886)
- Dicharax depressus (Bavay & Dautzenberg, 1912)
- Dicharax diagonius (Godwin-Austen, 1871)
- Dicharax digitatus (H. F. Blanford, 1871)
- Dicharax diminutus (Heude, 1885)
- Dicharax diplochilus (Möllendorff, 1887)
- Dicharax dohertyi (Godwin-Austen, 1893)
- Dicharax dolichodeiros (Heude, 1890)
- Dicharax draco Páll-Gergely & Hunyadi, 2017
- Dicharax duoculmen (Godwin-Austen, 1914)
- Dicharax duorugosus (Godwin-Austen, 1914)
- Dicharax ebrius Páll-Gergely & Auffenberg, 2021
- Dicharax edei (Godwin-Austen, 1914)
- Dicharax elevatus (Heude, 1886)
- Dicharax ellipticus Páll-Gergely, 2017
- Dicharax expanstoma (Minato, 1982)
- Dicharax expatriatus (W. T. Blanford & H. F. Blanford, 1860)
- Dicharax fargesianus (Heude, 1885)
- Dicharax fimbriatus (Bavay & Dautzenberg, 1912)
- Dicharax floridus Páll-Gergely & Hunyadi, 2022
- Dicharax footei (W. T. Blanford & H. F. Blanford, 1861)
- Dicharax fraterculus (Bavay & Dautzenberg, 1900)
- Dicharax gemma (Godwin-Austen, 1914)
- Dicharax gemmula (Benson, 1859)
- Dicharax generosus (Godwin-Austen, 1914)
- Dicharax glaber (W. T. Blanford, 1865)
- Dicharax globulus (Godwin-Austen, 1874)
- Dicharax gnomus Páll-Gergely, 2021
- Dicharax habiangensis (Godwin-Austen, 1914)
- Dicharax hebes (Benson, 1857)
- Dicharax humilis (W. T. Blanford, 1862)
- Dicharax imitator Páll-Gergely & Hunyadi, 2017
- Dicharax immaculatus Páll-Gergely, 2017
- Dicharax ingrami (W. T. Blanford, 1862)
- Dicharax itonis (Kuroda, 1943)
- Dicharax jaintiacus (Godwin-Austen, 1871)
- Dicharax japonicus (Martens, 1865)
- Dicharax kezamaensis (Godwin-Austen, 1914)
- Dicharax khasiacus (Godwin-Austen, 1871)
- Dicharax kiuchii (Minato & Abe, 1982)
- Dicharax floridus Páll-Gergely & Hunyadi, 2022
- Dicharax kurodatokubeii (Minato, 1987)
- Dicharax kurzianus (Theobald & Stoliczka, 1872)
- Dicharax lahupaensis (Godwin-Austen, 1914)
- Dicharax lectus (Godwin-Austen, 1914)
- Dicharax lenticulus (Godwin-Austen, 1874)
- Dicharax levis (Godwin-Austen, 1914)
- Dicharax logtakensis (Godwin-Austen, 1914)
- Dicharax longituba (Martens, 1864)
- Dicharax magnus (Godwin-Austen, 1893)
- Dicharax maosmaiensis (Godwin-Austen, 1922)
- Dicharax microcostatus Páll-Gergely, 2017
- Dicharax microdiscus (Möllendorff, 1887)
- Dicharax micropolitus Páll-Gergely & Hunyadi, 2017
- Dicharax mirounga Páll-Gergely, 2021
- Dicharax miyazakii (Takahashi & Habe, 1973)
- Dicharax moellendorffi (Kobelt & Möllendorff, 1897)
- Dicharax montanus G. Nevill, 1881
- Dicharax multirugosus (Godwin-Austen, 1874)
- Dicharax muspratti (Godwin-Austen, 1914)
- Dicharax mutatus (Godwin-Austen, 1876)
- Dicharax nagaensis (Godwin-Austen, 1871)
- Dicharax nakashimai (Minato, 1987)
- Dicharax nattoungensis (Godwin-Austen, 1914)
- Dicharax nishii (Minato, 2005)
- Dicharax nitidus (W. T. Blanford, 1862)
- Dicharax nongtungensis (Godwin-Austen, 1914)
- Dicharax notatus (Godwin-Austen, 1876)
- Dicharax notus (Godwin-Austen, 1914)
- Dicharax nowgongensis (Godwin-Austen, 1914)
- Dicharax obscurus (Godwin-Austen, 1914)
- Dicharax ochraceus (Godwin-Austen, 1893)
- Dicharax okamurai (Azuma, 1980)
- Dicharax okinawaensis (K. Uozumi, Yamamoto & Habe, 1979)
- Dicharax oligopleuris (Möllendorff, 1887)
- Dicharax omissus (Godwin-Austen, 1914)
- Dicharax oshimanus (Pilsbry & Y. Hirase, 1904)
- Dicharax ovatus Páll-Gergely & Auffenberg, 2021
- Dicharax ovatus Páll-Gergely & Auffenberg, 2021
- Dicharax pachitaensis (Godwin-Austen, 1886)
- Dicharax panhai Jirapatrasilp & Páll-Gergely, 2021
- Dicharax panshiensis (Chen, 1989)
- Dicharax parvulus (Möllendorff, 1887)
- Dicharax peilei (Preston, 1914)
- Dicharax placenovitas (Minato, 1981)
- Dicharax planorbulus (Heude, 1885)
- Dicharax plectocheilus (Benson, 1859)
- Dicharax plicilabris (Möllendorff, 1886)
- Dicharax politus (W. T. Blanford, 1865)
- Dicharax pongrati Jirapatrasilp & Tongkerd, 2021
- Dicharax pratatensis (Panha & Burch, 1997)
- Dicharax purus (Pilsbry & Y. Hirase, 1904)
- Dicharax pusillus (Godwin-Austen, 1871)
- Dicharax rechilaensis (Godwin-Austen, 1914)
- Dicharax robustus Páll-Gergely & Hunyadi, 2017
- Dicharax sandowayensis (Godwin-Austen, 1914)
- Dicharax sculpturus (Godwin-Austen, 1875)
- Dicharax serratus (Godwin-Austen, 1874)
- Dicharax shiibaensis (Minato, 2005)
- Dicharax shiosakimasahiroi (Yano, H. Matsuda & Nishi, 2016)
- Dicharax sonlaensis (Raheem & S. Schneider, 2017)
- Dicharax spatiosus Páll-Gergely & Hunyadi, 2022
- Dicharax spiracellum (Adams & Reeve, 1850)
- Dicharax stoliczkii (Godwin-Austen, 1874)
- Dicharax strangulatus (L. Pfeiffer, 1846)
- Dicharax strigatus (Godwin-Austen, 1874)
- Dicharax stuparum Páll-Gergely & Hunyadi, 2018
- Dicharax subculmen (Godwin-Austen, 1893)
- Dicharax subhumilis (Möllendorff, 1897)
- Dicharax subroseus Páll-Gergely, 2021
- Dicharax succineus (W. T. Blanford, 1862)
- Dicharax sylheticus (Godwin-Austen, 1914)
- Dicharax tadai (Kuroda & Kawamoto, 1956)
- Dicharax takahashii (Habe, 1976)
- Dicharax tanegashimae (Pilsbry, 1902)
- Dicharax tangmaiensis (D.-N. Chen & G.-Q. Zhang, 2001)
- Dicharax theobaldi (W. T. Blanford, 1862)
- Dicharax tokunoshimanus (Pilsbry & Y. Hirase, 1904)
- Dicharax tsushimanus (Pilsbry & Y. Hirase, 1909)
- Dicharax umbonalis (Benson, 1856)
- Dicharax verrucosus Páll-Gergely & Hunyadi, 2021
- Dicharax vestitus (W. T. Blanford, 1862)
- Dicharax woodthorpi (Godwin-Austen, 1914)
- Dicharax yanoshigehumii (Minato, 1987)
- Dicharax yanoshokoae (Yano & H. Matsuda, 2016)

Species brought into synonymy

- Dicharax canaliculatus (Möllendorff, 1894): synonym of Chamalycaeus canaliculatus (Möllendorff, 1894) (unaccepted combination)
- Dicharax crenulatus (Benson, 1859): synonym of Metalycaeus crenulatus (Benson, 1859) (unaccepted combination)
- Dicharax davisi (Godwin-Austen, 1914): synonym of Dicharax cucullatus (Theobald, 1870) (junior synonym)
- Dicharax neglectus (Heude, 1885): synonym of Metalycaeus rathouisianus (Heude, 1882) (unaccepted combination)
- Dicharax neglectus (Godwin-Austen, 1914): synonym of Metalycaeus godwinausteni Páll-Gergely, 2020 (invalid: senior homonym of Alycaeus neglectus Heude, 1885)
- Dicharax prosectus (Benson, 1857): synonym of Metalycaeus prosectus (Benson, 1857) (unaccepted combination)
- Dicharax rugosus (Godwin-Austen, 1914): synonym of Metalycaeus rugosus (Godwin-Austen, 1914) (unaccepted combination)
- Dicharax stylifer (Benson, 1857): synonym of Metalycaeus stylifer (Benson, 1857) (unaccepted combination)
- Dicharax teriaensis (Godwin-Austen, 1914): synonym of Metalycaeus teriaensis (Godwin-Austen, 1914) (unaccepted combination)
- Dicharax toruputuensis (Godwin-Austen, 1914): synonym of Metalycaeus toruputuensis (Godwin-Austen, 1914) (unaccepted combination)
