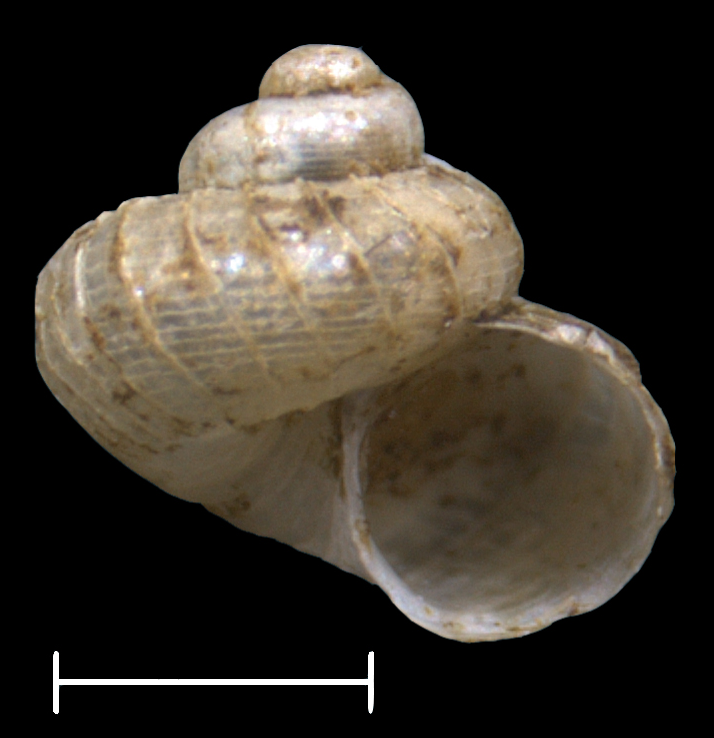
- Maizaniella sapoensis shell

Scientific classification
- Kingdom: Animalia
- Phylum: Mollusca
- Class: Gastropoda
- Subclass: Caenogastropoda
- Order: Architaenioglossa
- Family: Maizaniidae
- Genus: Maizaniella
- Species: M. sapoensis

Binomial name
- Maizaniella sapoensis de Winter, 2009

= Maizaniella sapoensis =

Species of gastropod

Maizaniella sapoensis is a species of land snail with an operculum, a terrestrial gastropod mollusc in the family Maizaniidae.

== Taxonomy ==
The specific name sapoensis is named after Sapo National Park, Liberia, where it lives. The species is provisionally attributed to the subgenus Spirulozania on account of the conspicuous spiral sculpture. Type material is stored in the National Museum of Natural History, Leiden (Rijksmuseum van Natuurlijke Historie).

== Distribution ==
Distribution of Maizaniella sapoensis include Liberia and it is only known from the type locality, 5°20′N 8°47′W.

== Description ==
The shape of the shell is high-spired in comparison with other Maizaniella species. The color of the periostracum is pale yellow-brown. The shell has three whorls. The sculpture is regularly curved, with thin axial ribs (about 20 on the third whorl) and with fine spiral threads. The aperture is large and circular, about 1 mm in diameter. The umbilicus is narrow.

The size of the shell is extremely small (about 2.1 mm wide at three whorls). The width of the shell is 2.05-2.3 mm. The height of the shell is from 1.88 m to estimated 2.1 mm.

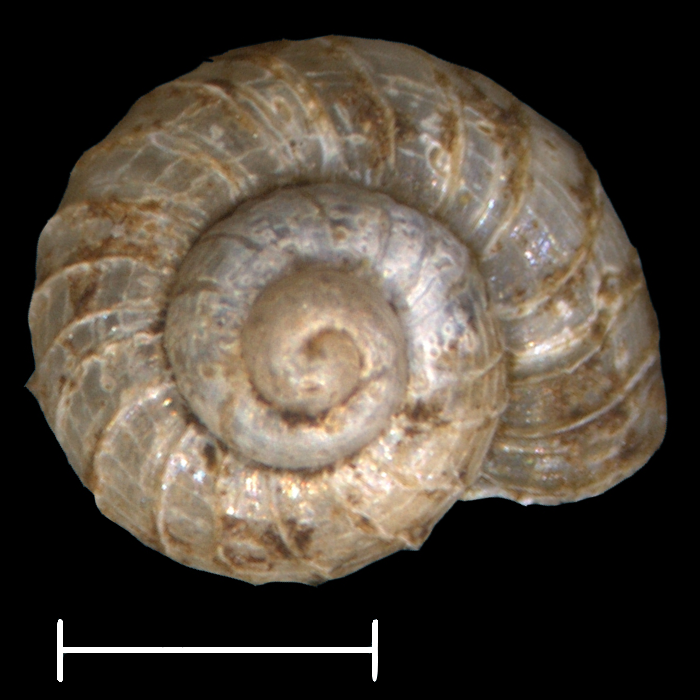
Apical view.

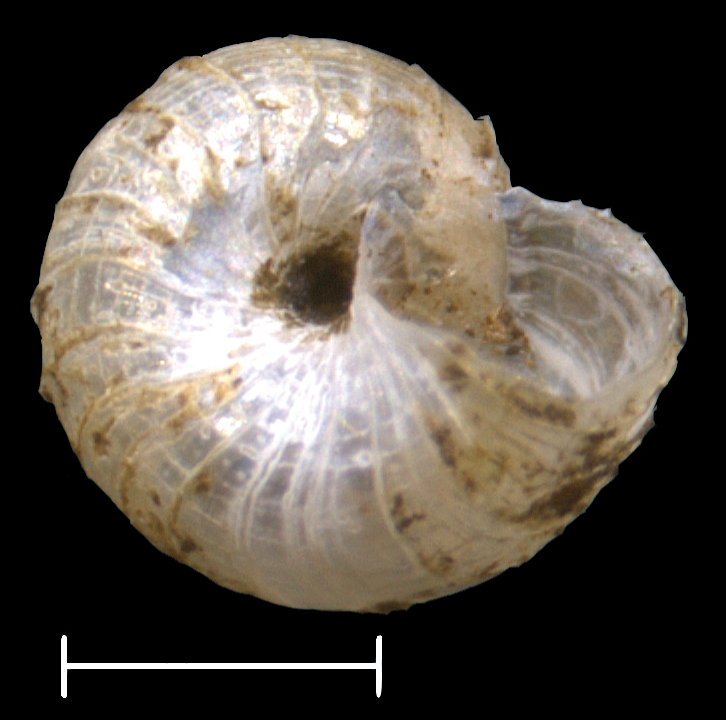
Umbilical view.

== Ecology ==
It was recorded in a floor litter from higher spots in a swampy area in wet undisturbed lowland rainforest (evergreen forest) at altitude 140 m.
