= Chamalycaeus =

Scientific classification
- Kingdom: Animalia
- Phylum: Mollusca
- Class: Gastropoda
- Subclass: Caenogastropoda
- Order: Architaenioglossa
- Family: Alycaeidae
- Genus: Chamalycaeus; Möllendorff, 1897

Synonyms
- Alycaeus (Chamalycaeus) Möllendorff, 1897; Chamalychaeus

Genus of gastropods

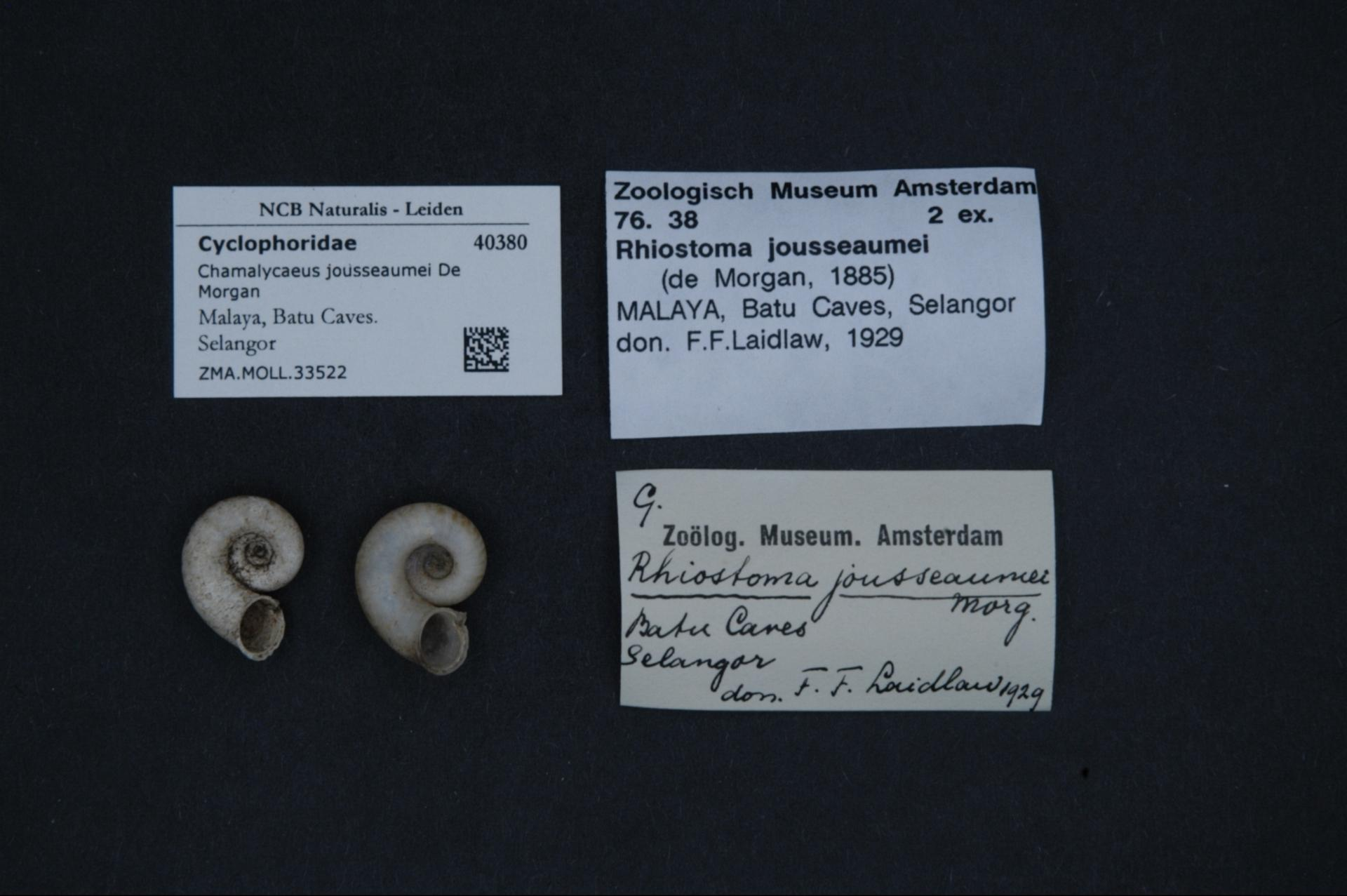
Chamalycaeus jousseaumei (De Morgan, 1885)

Chamalycaeus is a genus of tropical land snails with an operculum, terrestrial gastropod mollusks in the family Alycaeidae.

== Species ==
As of 30 November 2020, WoRMS records the following species in this genus:

- Chamalycaeus andamaniae (Benson, 1861)
- Chamalycaeus armillatus (Benson, 1856)
- Chamalycaeus busbyi (Godwin-Austen, 1893)
- Chamalycaeus canaliculatus (Möllendorff, 1894)
- Chamalycaeus celebensis (Martens, 1891)
- Chamalycaeus everetti (Godwin-Austen, 1889)
- Chamalycaeus excisus (Möllendorff, 1887)
- Chamalycaeus expanstoma Minato, 1982
- Chamalycaeus fruhstorferi (Möllendorff, 1897)
- Chamalycaeus kessneri Vermeulen, 1996
- Chamalycaeus microconus (Möllendorff, 1887)
- Chamalycaeus mixtus Zilch, 1957
- Chamalycaeus miyazakii Takahashi & Habe, 1973
- Chamalycaeus nagaensis (Godwin-Austen, 1871)
- Chamalycaeus oglei (Godwin-Austen, 1914)
- Chamalycaeus perplexus (Godwin-Austen, 1914)
- Chamalycaeus rarus Páll-Gergely & Auffenberg, 2019
- Chamalycaeus reinhardti (Mörch, 1872)
- Chamalycaeus reticulatus (Möllendorff, 1897)
- Chamalycaeus richthofeni (W. T. Blanford, 1863)
- Chamalycaeus sculptilis (Benson, 1856)
- Chamalycaeus specus (Godwin-Austen, 1889)
- Chamalycaeus subfossilis (P. Sarasin & F. Sarasin, 1899)
- Chamalycaeus sumatranus (Martens, 1900)
- Chamalycaeus takahashii Habe, 1976
- Chamalycaeus tanghali (Godwin-Austen, 1914)
- Chamalycaeus troglodytes (B. Rensch, 1934)
- Chamalycaeus vulcani (W. T. Blanford, 1863)
- Chamalycaeus yanoshigehumii Minato, 1987
