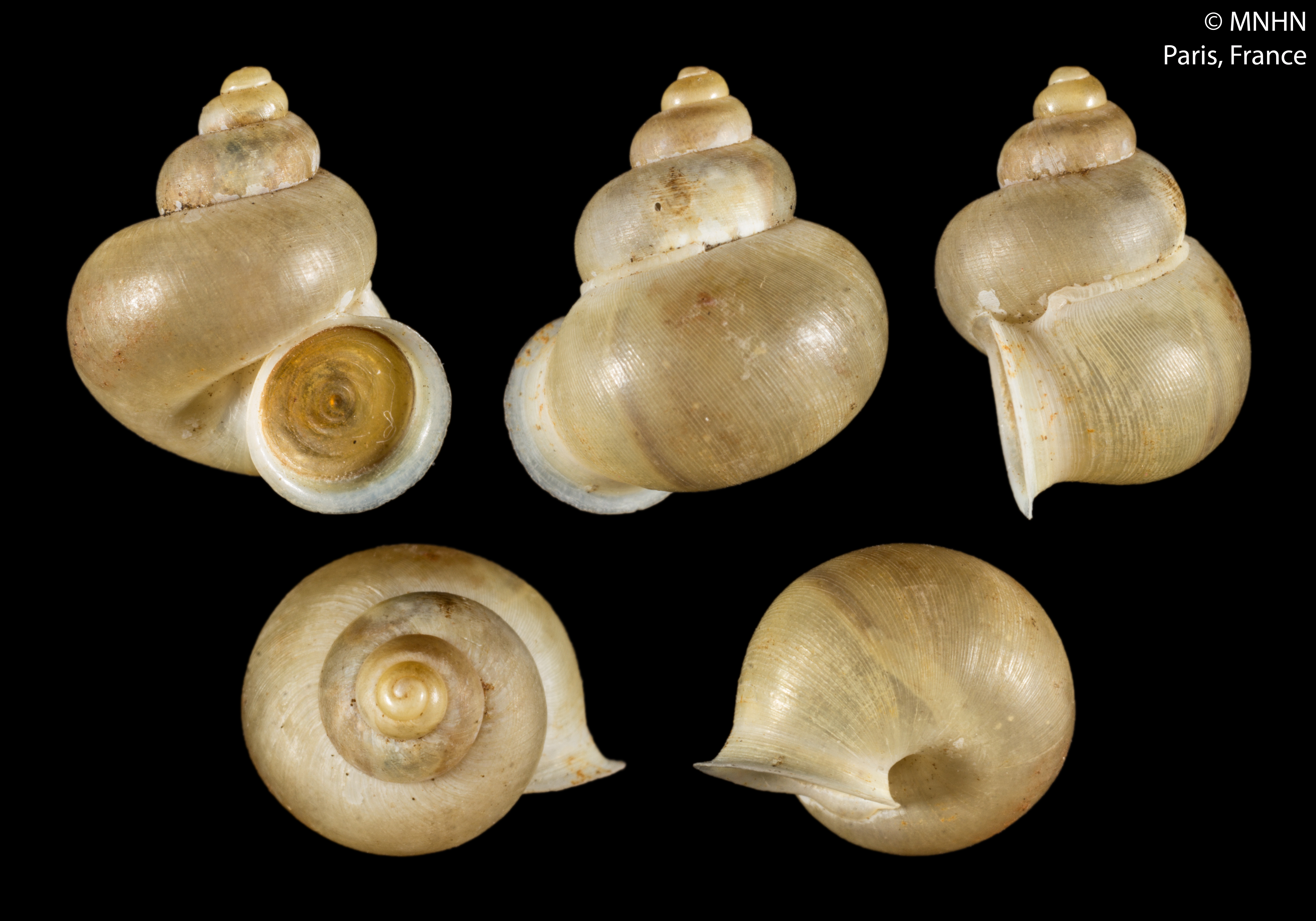
- Shell of Dioryx messageri

Scientific classification
- Kingdom: Animalia
- Phylum: Mollusca
- Class: Gastropoda
- Subclass: Caenogastropoda
- Order: Architaenioglossa
- Family: Cyclophoridae
- Genus: Dioryx; Benson, 1859

Synonyms
- Alycaeus (Dioryx) Benson, 1859 (original rank)

= Dioryx =

Genus of gastropods

Dioryx is a genus of air-breathing land snails in the family Cyclophoridae. It was formerly considered a subgenus of Alycaeus.

== Species ==
Species within the genus Dioryx include:

- Dioryx amphora (Benson, 1856)
- Dioryx bacca (L. Pfeiffer, 1863)
- Dioryx cariniger Möllendorff, 1897
- Dioryx compactus (Bavay & Dautzenberg, 1900)
- Dioryx dautzenbergi Páll-Gergely, 2017
- Dioryx distortus (Haines, 1855)
- Dioryx dongiensis Varga, 1972
- Dioryx feddenianus (Theobald, 1870)
- Dioryx globulosus (Godwin-Austen, 1914)
- Dioryx globulus (Möllendorff, 1885)
- Dioryx kobeltianus (Möllendorff, 1874)
- Dioryx menglunensis D.-N. Chen & G.-Q. Zhang, 1998
- Dioryx messageri (Bavay & Dautzenberg, 1900)
- Dioryx monadicus (Heude, 1890)
- Dioryx pilula (Gould, 1859)
- Dioryx pocsi Varga, 1972
- Dioryx requiescens (J. Mabille, 1887)
- Dioryx rosea (Bavay & Dautzenberg, 1900)
- Dioryx setchuanensis (Heude, 1885)
- Dioryx swinhoei (H. Adams, 1866)
- Dioryx urceolus (Godwin-Austen, 1914)
- Dioryx urnula (Benson, 1853)
- Dioryx varius (Godwin-Austen, 1914)
