= Ferussinidae =

Scientific classification
- Kingdom: Animalia
- Phylum: Mollusca
- Class: Gastropoda
- Subclass: Caenogastropoda
- Order: Architaenioglossa
- Superfamily: Cyclophoroidea
- Family: †Ferussinidae; Wenz, 1923 (1915)

Extinct family of gastropods

†Ferussinidae is an extinct family of operculate freshwater snails, aquatic gastropod mollusks in the informal group Architaenioglossa.
