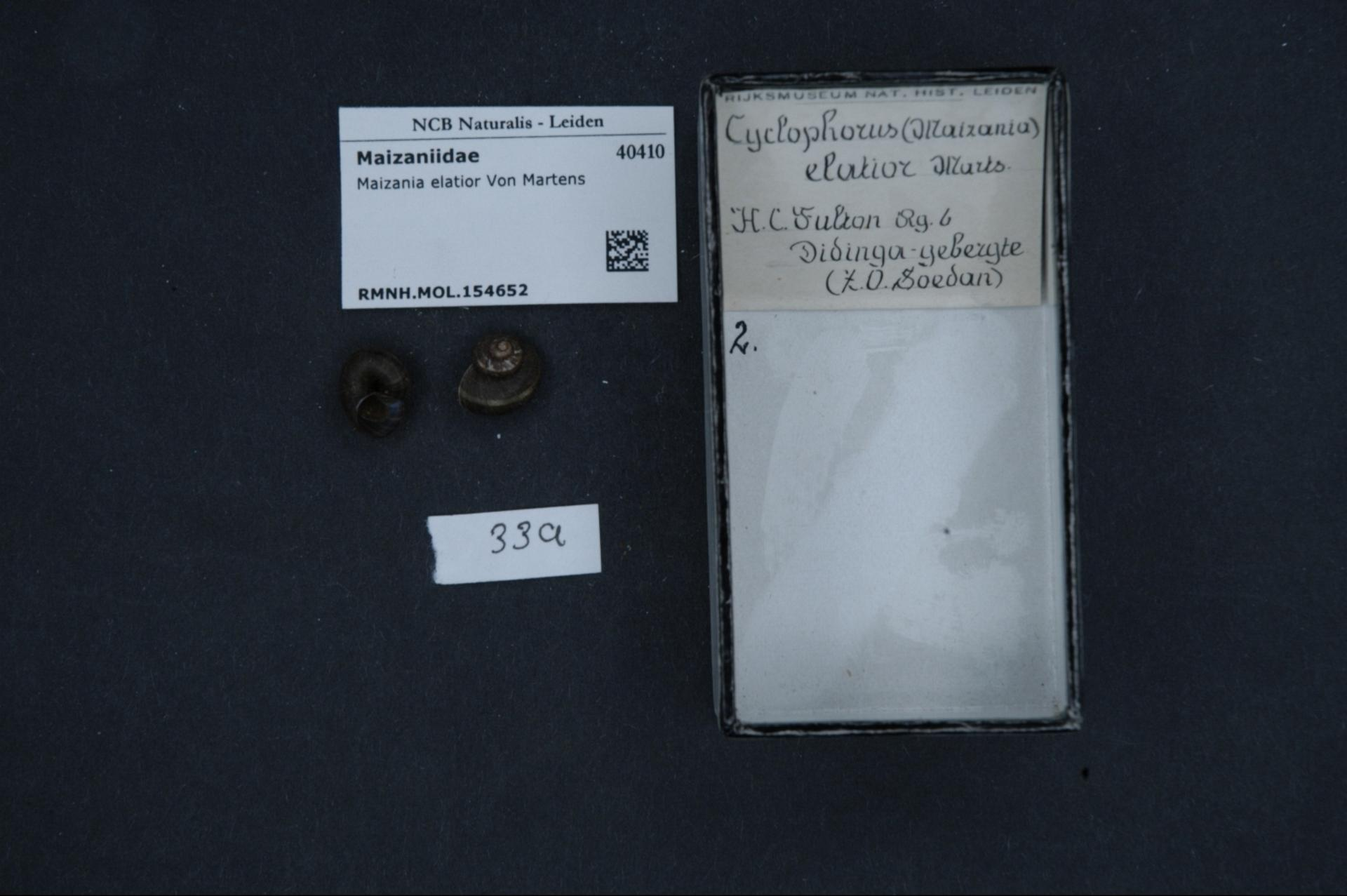
- Maizania elatior

Scientific classification
- Kingdom: Animalia
- Phylum: Mollusca
- Class: Gastropoda
- Subclass: Caenogastropoda
- Order: Architaenioglossa
- Family: Maizaniidae
- Genus: Maizania; Bourguignat, 1890

= Maizania =

Genus of land snails

Maizania is a genus of gastropods belonging to the family Maizaniidae.

The species of this genus are found in Africa.

Species:

- Maizania angolensis (Dohrn, 1878)
- Maizania chondrocycloides Bequaert & Clench, 1936
- Maizania depressa Verdcourt, 1963
- Maizania elatior (E.von Martens, 1892)
- Maizania furadana G.A.Holyoak & D.T.Holyoak, 2020
- Maizania hildebrandti (E.von Martens, 1878)
- Maizania kazibae Adam, 1987
- Maizania lugubrioides Verdcourt, 1963
- Maizania magilensis (Craven, 1880)
- Maizania marsabitensis Verdcourt, 1963
- Maizania miocenica Verdcourt, 1963
- Maizania natalensis (L.Pfeiffer, 1861)
- Maizania olivacea Bourguignat, 1890
- Maizania pocsi Varga, 1976
- Maizania scalarioidea van Bruggen, 1983
- Maizania subdepressa Verdcourt, 1963
- Maizania volkensi (E.von Martens, 1895)
- Maizania wahlbergi (Benson, 1852)
- Maizania zanzibarica Bequaert & Clench, 1936
