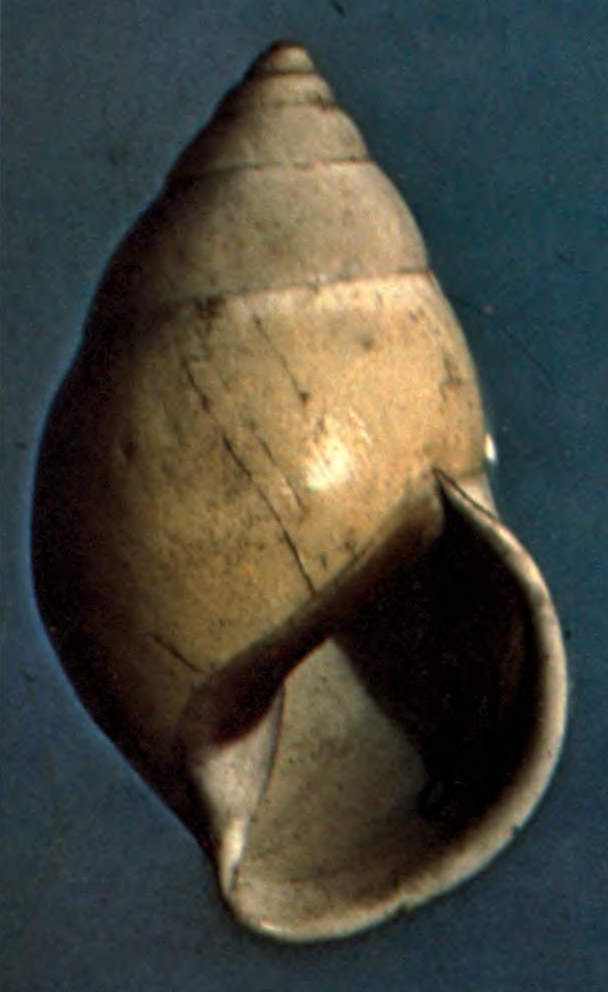
- Apertural view of the shell of holotype of Amphidromus similis from Mount Dadap, Borneo.

Scientific classification
- Kingdom: Animalia
- Phylum: Mollusca
- Class: Gastropoda
- Order: Stylommatophora
- Family: Camaenidae
- Genus: Amphidromus
- Species: A. similis

Binomial name
- Amphidromus similis Pilsbry, 1900

Synonyms
- Amphidromus (Amphidromus) similis Pilsbry, 1900 alternative representation; Amphidromus perversus f. similis Pilsbry, 1900 (original rank)

= Amphidromus similis =

Species of gastropod

Amphidromus similis is a species of air-breathing land snail, a terrestrial pulmonate gastropod mollusc in the family Camaenidae.

== Description ==
(Original description) Mr. A. Everett collected two dextral specimens at Sadong, West Sarawak, one of which Mr. E. A. Smith illustrated. Neither of these specimens exhibits black varices, and the parietal wall is dark, similar to Amphidromus atricallosus. Schepman mentions similar specimens from Mt. Sekedau and Mt. Dadap, collected by Moret, but he notes that they possess brown spots on the white zone near the suture. This form appears to be a parallel modification, rather than genetically connected with A. atricallosus of the mainland, and may be designated form similis.

== Distribution ==
This species is endemic to Sasong, West Sarawak, Malaysia.
