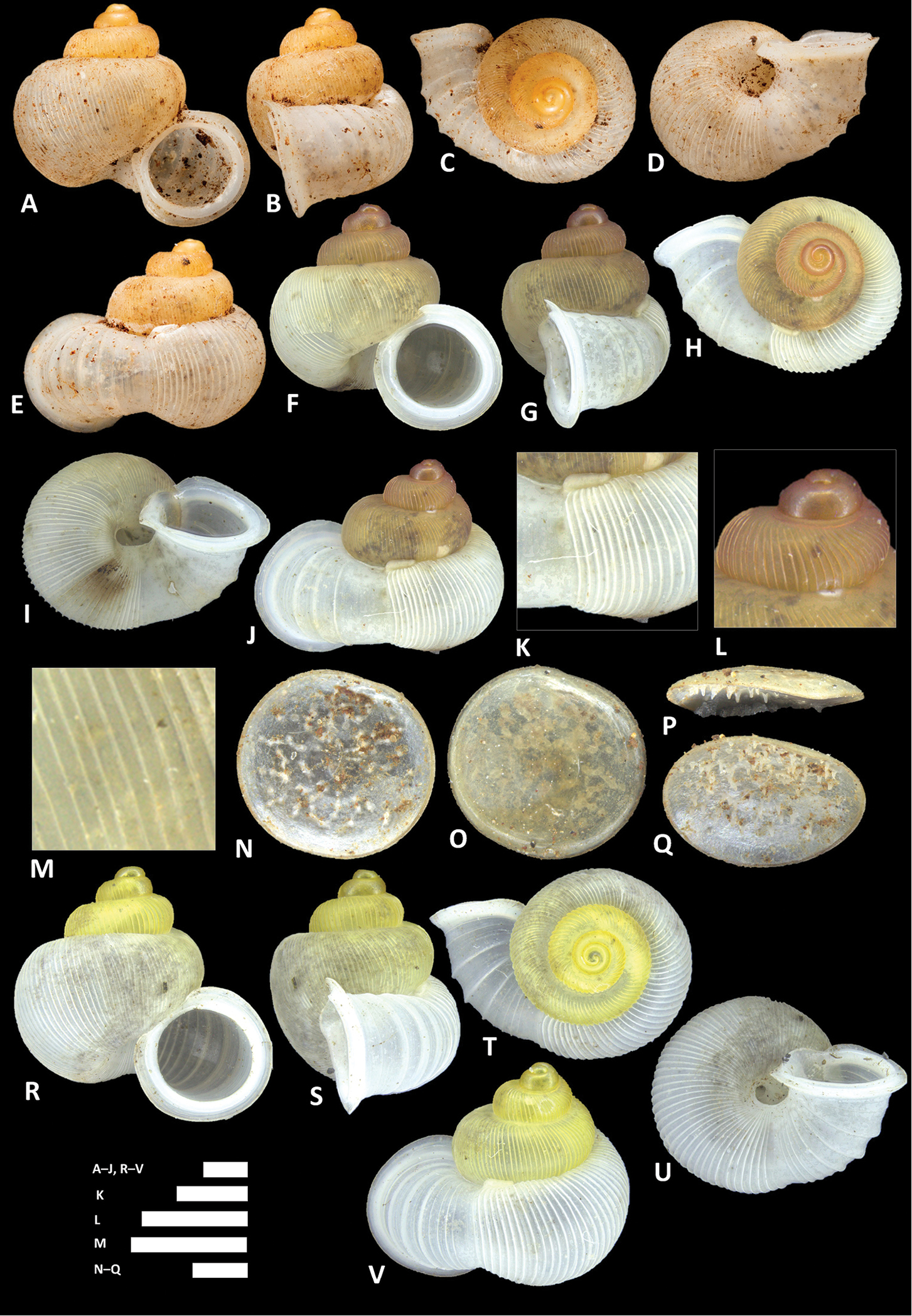

Conservation status
- Critically Endangered (IUCN 3.1)

Scientific classification
- Kingdom: Animalia
- Phylum: Mollusca
- Class: Gastropoda
- Subclass: Caenogastropoda
- Order: Architaenioglossa
- Family: Alycaeidae
- Genus: Stomacosmethis
- Species: S. balingensis

Binomial name
- Stomacosmethis balingensis (Tomlin, 1948)

Synonyms
- Alycaeus balingensis Tomlin, 1948 (basionym)

= Stomacosmethis balingensis =

Species of gastropod

Stomacosmethis balingensis is a species of land snail with a gill and an operculum, a terrestrial gastropod mollusc in the family Alycaeidae.

== Distribution ==
The distribution of S. balingensis is limited to the limestone karst at Bukit Baling, Kedah, Peninsular Malaysia.

== Conservation ==
Stomacosmethis balingensis is threatened by habitat destruction due to ongoing quarrying activities.
