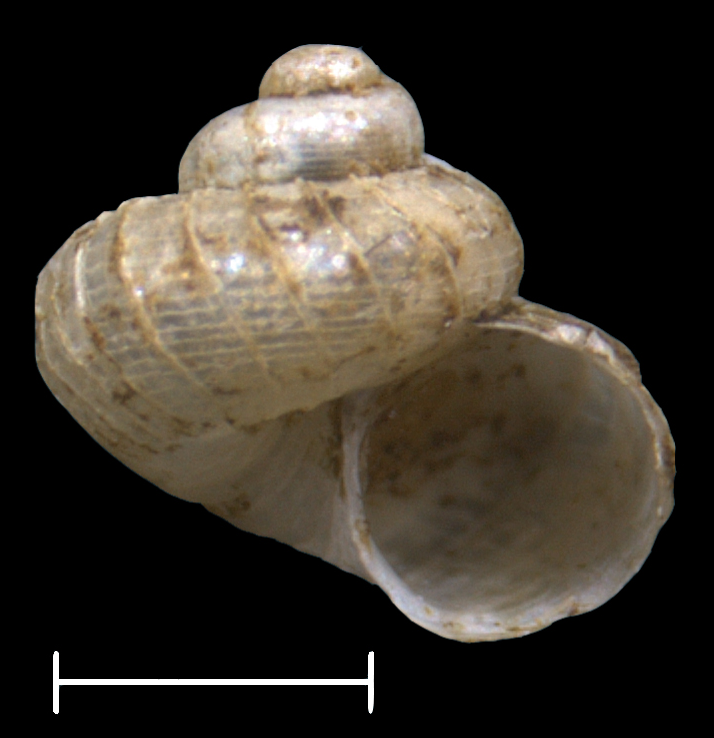
- Maizaniella sapoensis shell

Scientific classification
- Kingdom: Animalia
- Phylum: Mollusca
- Class: Gastropoda
- Subclass: Caenogastropoda
- Order: Architaenioglossa
- Superfamily: Cyclophoroidea
- Family: Maizaniidae; Tielecke, 1940

= Maizaniidae =

Maizaniidae Temporal range: 28.4–present Ma

Family of gastropods

Maizaniidae is a family of small land snails with an operculum, terrestrial gastropod molluscs in the superfamily Cyclophoroidea (according to the taxonomy of the Gastropoda by Bouchet & Rocroi, 2005).

This family has no subfamilies.

== Genera ==
Genera within the family Maizaniidae include:

- Maizania Bourguignat, 1889 - the type genus of the family
- Maizaniella Bequaert & Clench, 1836
- Neomaizania Van Bruggen, 1985
- Thomeomaizania Bequeart and Clench, 1936
