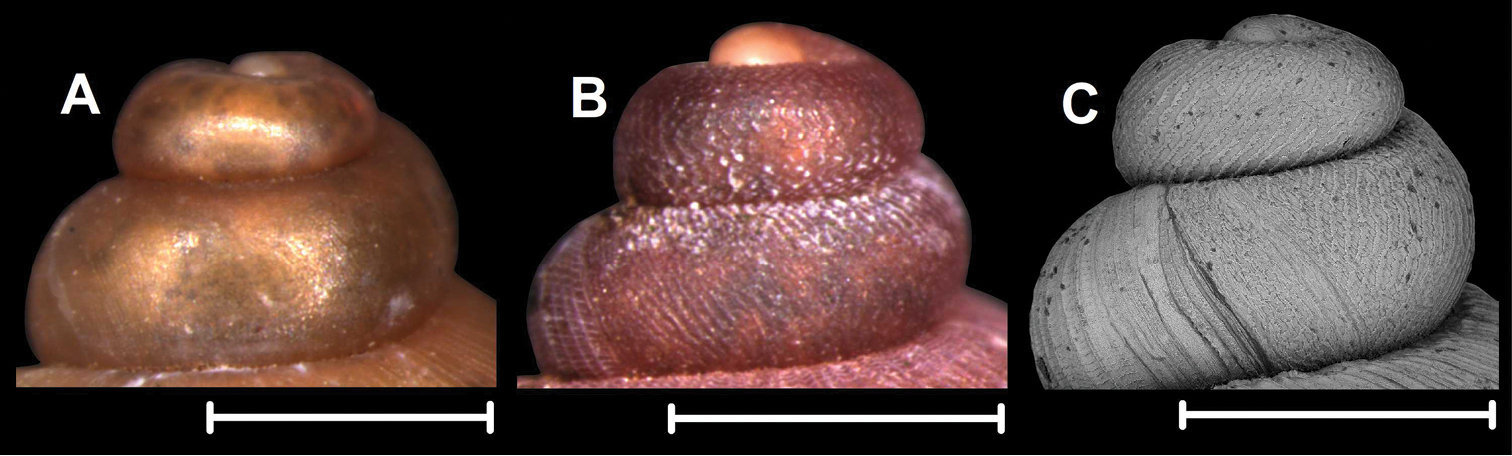
- Shell of Alycaeus conformis (fig. C)

Scientific classification
- Kingdom: Animalia
- Phylum: Mollusca
- Class: Gastropoda
- Subclass: Caenogastropoda
- Order: Architaenioglossa
- Superfamily: Cyclophoroidea
- Family: Alycaeidae
- Genus: Alycaeus
- Species: A. conformis

Binomial name
- Alycaeus conformis Fulton, 1902
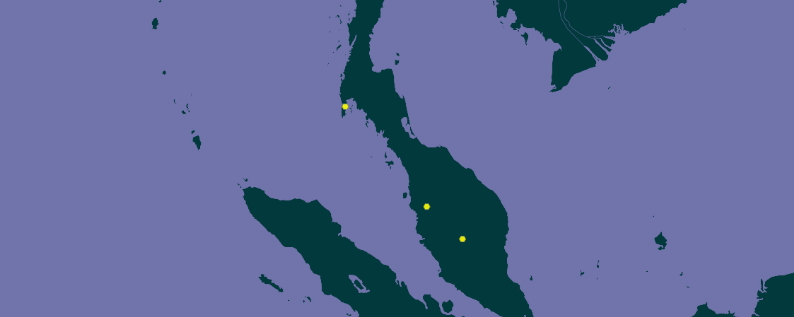

= Alycaeus conformis =

Species of gastropod

Alycaeus conformis is a species of small land snails with a gill and an operculum, terrestrial gastropod mollusks in the family Alycaeidae.

== Description ==
The length of the shell attains 10 mm, its diameter 8.5 mm.

(Original description) The conical shell is very narrowly perforate and has a reddish apex. The lower whorls are either cream or suffused with pale pink. They are closely and finely obliquely striated. The larval whorls display similar striations, but in the opposite direction. There are 5 very convex whorls, with the body whorl inflated and constricted about 2 mm from the peristome. A breathing pore emerges at the start of the constriction and extends about half a whorl along the suture. The aperture is circular, with an expanded but non-reflected peristome, featuring an inner projecting rim. The operculum is concave, with approximately 6 whorls.

== Distribution ==
This species occurs in Peninsular Malaysia.
