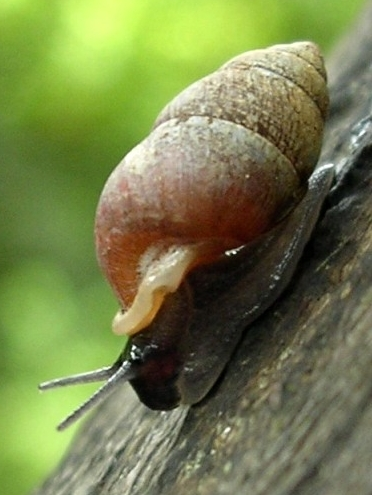
- Pupinella rufa

Scientific classification
- Kingdom: Animalia
- Phylum: Mollusca
- Class: Gastropoda
- Subclass: Caenogastropoda
- Order: Architaenioglossa
- Superfamily: Cyclophoroidea; Gray, 1847

Families
- Aciculidae; Craspedopomatidae; Cyclophoridae; Diplommatinidae; † Ferussinidae; Maizaniidae; Megalomastomatidae; Neocyclotidae; Pupinidae

= Cyclophoroidea =

Cyclophoroidea Temporal range: Albian–Recent

Superfamily of gastropods

Cyclophoroidea is a superfamily of land snails with an operculum, terrestrial gastropods within the order Architaenioglossa, that belongs to the subclass Caenogastropoda. Approximately 3,675 cyclophoroid species were known as of 2024, making them the second-most diverse clade of land snails after Stylommatophora.

These terrestrial gastropods have lost the ctenidium (comb-like respiratory apparatus) and osphradium, and the pallial cavity has been modified as a lung.

Cyclophoroids have detritivorous or herbivorous diets.

Cyclophoroids probably originated in the Late Jurassic or Early Cretaceous based on molecular clock estimates. Several fossil species are known from Burmese amber that dates to the mid-Cretaceous, approximately 99 million years ago.

== Taxonomy ==
According to the Taxonomy of the Gastropoda (Bouchet & Rocroi, 2005), this superfamily consists of the following families:

- Family Aciculidae Gray, 1850
- Family Alycaeidae W. T. Blanford,
- Genus † Carinomphalus W. Yü, 1974
- Family Cochlostomatidae Kobelt, 1902
- Family Craspedopomatidae Kobelt & Möllendorff, 1898
- Family Cyclophoridae Gray, 1847
  - Subfamily Cyclophorinae Gray, 1847
    - Tribe Caspicyclotini Wenz, 1938
    - Tribe Cyathopomatini Kobelt & Möllendorff, 1897
    - Tribe Cyclophorini Gray, 1847
    - Tribe Cyclotini Pfeiffer, 1853
    - Tribe Pterocyclini Kobelt & Möllendorff, 1897
  - Subfamily Spirostomatinae Tielecke, 1940
- Family Diplommatinidae Pfeiffer, 1857
  - Subfamily Diplommatininae Pfeiffer, 1857
- Genus † Diplommoptychia Maillard, 1884
- † Family Ferussinidae Wenz, 1923 (1915): accepted as † Ferussininae Wenz, 1923 (1915)
- Genus † Loriolina Huckriede,
- Genus †Maillardinus , 1991
- Family Maizaniidae Tielecke, 1940
- Family Megalomastomatidae Blanford, 1864
- Family Neocyclotidae Kobelt & Möllendorff, 1897
  - Subfamily Amphicyclotinae Kobelt & Möllendorff, 1897
- Family Pupinidae Pfeiffer, 1853
  - Subfamily Liareinae Powell, 1946
  - Subfamily Pupinellinae Kobelt, 1902
  - Subfamily Pupininae Pfeiffer, 1853

Families brought into synonymy

- Acmeidae Pollonera, 1905: synonym of Aciculidae Gray, 1850
- Alycaeidae Blanford, 1864: synonym of Cyclophoridae Gray, 1847
- Bolaniidae Wenz, 1915: synonym of Craspedopomatidae Kobelt & Möllendorff, 1898
- Dicristidae Golikov & Starobogatov, 1975: synonym of Neocyclotidae Kobelt & Möllendorff, 1897
- Lagocheilidae Stoliczka, 1872: synonym of Cyclophoroidea Gray, 1847
- † Strophostomatidae Wenz, 1915: synonym of † Ferussinidae Wenz, 1923 (1915)
