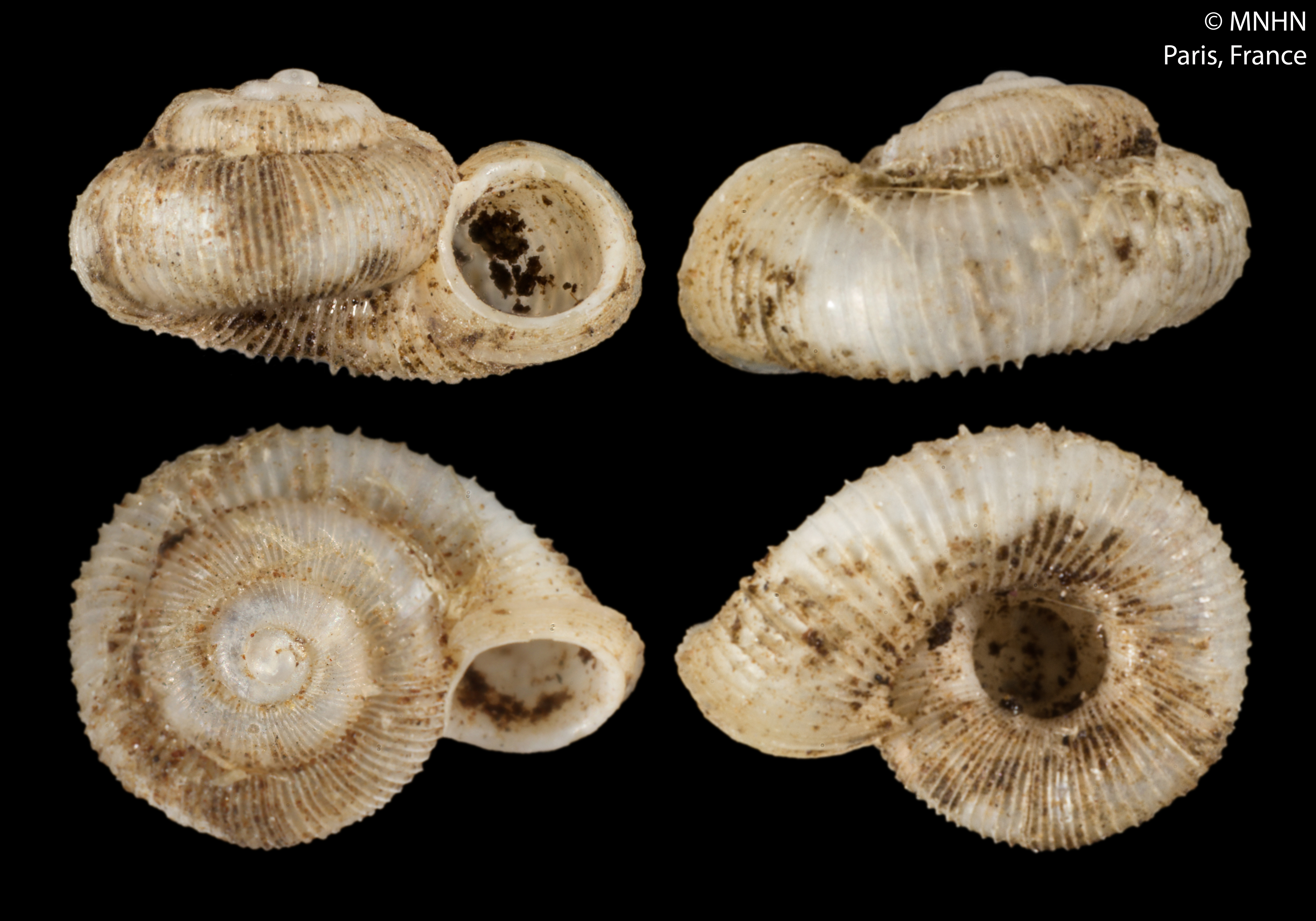
- Shell of Laotia pahiensis (syntype at MNHN, Paris)

Scientific classification
- Kingdom: Animalia
- Phylum: Mollusca
- Class: Gastropoda
- Subclass: Caenogastropoda
- Order: Architaenioglossa
- Superfamily: Cyclophoroidea
- Family: Alycaeidae; W. T. Blanford, 1864

Synonyms
- Alycaeinae W. T. Blanford, 1864 (unaccepted rank)

= Alycaeidae =

Family of gastropods

Alycaeidae is a taxonomic family of small to large tropical land snails with an operculum, terrestrial gastropod mollusks in the superfamily Cyclophoroidea.

== Genera ==
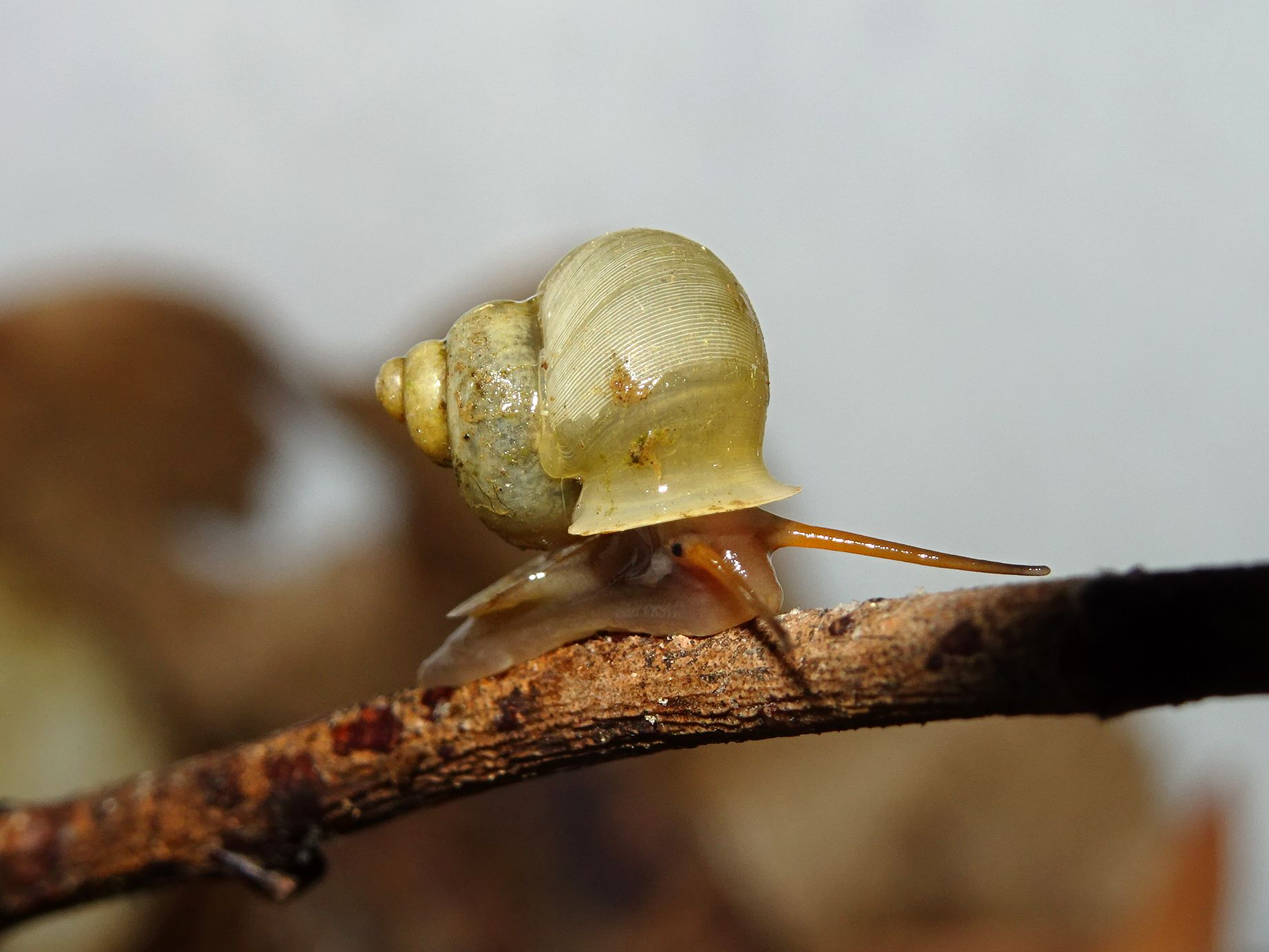
Live individual of Dioryx messageri (Bavay & Dautzenberg, 1900) from Cúc Phương National Park, Vietnam

- Alycaeus Gray, 1850
- Boucardicus Fischer-Piette & Bedoucha, 1965
- Chamalycaeus Kobelt & Möllendorff, 1897
- Cycloryx Godwin-Austen, 1914
- Dicharax Kobelt & Möllendorff, 1900
- Dioryx Benson, 1859
- Laotia Saurin, 1953
- Messageria Bavay & Dautzenberg, 1904
- Metalycaeus Pilsbry, 1900
- Pincerna Preston, 1907
- Stomacosmethis Bollinger, 1918

Synonyms

- Alcaeus Gray, 1850: synonym of Alycaeus Gray, 1850 (incorrect subsequent spelling)
- Awalycaeus Kuroda, 1951: synonym of Dicharax Kobelt & Möllendorff, 1900 (junior synonym)
- Cipangocharax Kuroda, 1943: synonym of Dicharax Kobelt & Möllendorff, 1900 (junior synonym)
