= List of non-marine molluscs of the Philippines =

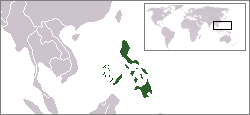
Location of the Philippines

The non-marine mollusks of the Philippines are a part of the molluscan fauna of the Philippines (the wildlife of the Philippines). A number of species of non-marine mollusks are found in the wild in the Philippines.

== Freshwater gastropods ==
Pomatiopsidae

- Oncomelania hupensis Gredler, 1881

== Land gastropods ==
Alycaeidae

- Chamalycaeus excisus excisus (Möllendorff, 1887)
- Chamalycaeus excisus sublimus Páll-Gergely & Auffenberg, 2019
- Chamalycaeus rarus Páll-Gergely & Auffenberg, 2019
- Metalycaeus quadrasi (Möllendorff, 1895)
- Metalycaeus cyphogyrus (Quadras & Möllendorff,1895)
- Metalycaeus caroli (Semper, 1862)
- Metalycaeus semperi Páll-Gergely & Auffenberg, 2019
- Metalycaeus tomotrema (Möllendorff,1887)

Diplommatinidae

- Diplommatina cagayanica Möllendorff, 1893
- Diplommatina (Sinica) concolor Quadras & Möllendorff, 1893
- Diplommatina (Sinica) filicostata Möllendorff, 1893
- Diplommatina latilabris Kobelt, 1886
- Luzonocoptis angulata Páll-Gergely & Hunyadi, 2017
- Luzonocoptis antenna Páll-Gergely & Hunyadi, 2017
- Palaina conspicua Möllendorff, 1893
- Palaina conspicua versicolor Möllendorff, 1893
- Palaina cristata Quadras & Möllendorff, 1893

Diapheridae

- Diaphera cumingiana (Pfeiffer, 1845)

Hypselostomatidae

- Aulacospira hololoma (Möllendorf, 1887)
- Aulacospira krobyloides Páll-Gergely & Schilthuizen, 2019
- Aulacospira lens Páll-Gergely & Auffenberg, 2019
- Aulacospira mucronata (Möllendorf, 1887)
- Aulacospira porrecta Quadras & Möllendorf, 1894
- Aulacospira rhombostoma Quadras & Möllendorf, 1896
- Aulacospira scalatella (Möllendorf, 1888)
- Aulacospira triptycha Quadras & Möllendorf, 1895
- Pseudostreptaxis azpeitiae (Hidalgo, 1890)
- Pseudostreptaxis harli Páll-Gergely & Schilthuizen, 2019

== See also ==
Lists of molluscs of surrounding countries:

- List of non-marine molluscs of Taiwan
- List of non-marine molluscs of China
- List of non-marine molluscs of Hong Kong
- List of non-marine molluscs of Malaysia
- List of non-marine molluscs of Vietnam
