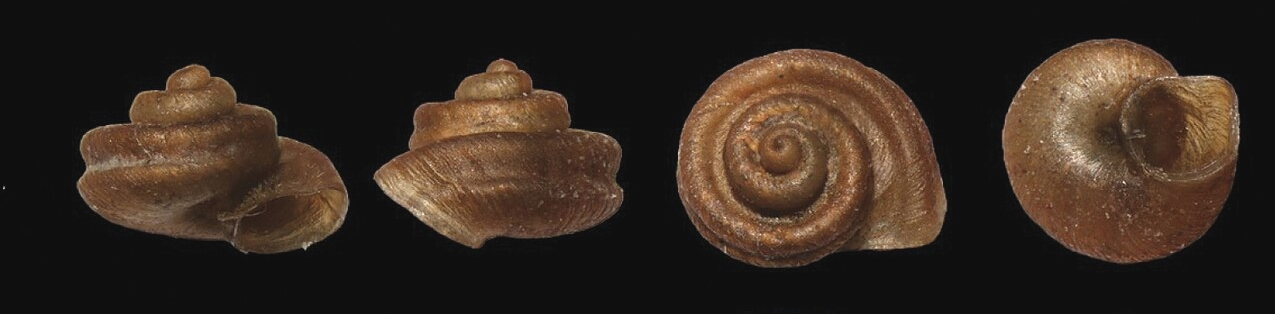
- Shell of Aulacospira khaobote

Scientific classification
- Kingdom: Animalia
- Phylum: Mollusca
- Class: Gastropoda
- Order: Stylommatophora
- Family: Hypselostomatidae
- Genus: Aulacospira
- Species: A. khaopratun

Binomial name
- Aulacospira khaopratun Dumrongrojwattana & Panha, 2005

= Aulacospira khaopratun =

Species of gastropod

Aulacospira khaopratun is a species of small land snail with an operculum, terrestrial pulmonate gastropod mollusc in the family Cyclophoridae.

== Description ==
(original description) The height of the shell varies between 1.61 mm and 1.80 mm, its diameter between 1.81 mm and 2.38 mm.

The shell is minute and depressed, featuring a moderately high spire and a brownish coloration. Both the protoconch and the teleoconch are smooth. The body whorl is notably large and is defined by two prominent spiral carinae (keels). The tuba is short, leading to an expanded peristome, and the aperture lacks teeth entirely.

Radular structure: The radula is consistent in form with that of Aulacospira depressa. It likely follows the same formula and morphology, characterized by a small, unicuspid central tooth flanked by irregularly bicuspid lateral and marginal teeth.

== Distribution ==
This species occurs in Thailand on limestome rocks.
