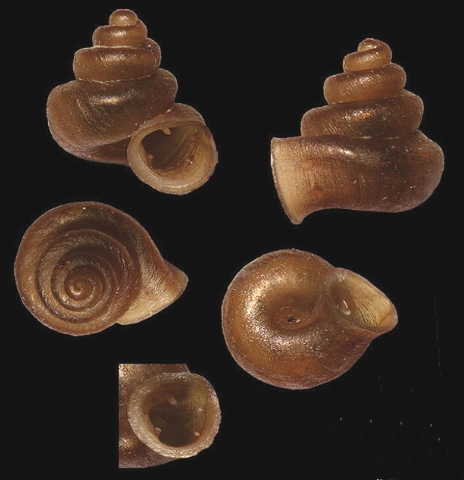
- Shell of Aulacospira pluangtong

Scientific classification
- Kingdom: Animalia
- Phylum: Mollusca
- Class: Gastropoda
- Order: Stylommatophora
- Family: Hypselostomatidae
- Genus: Aulacospira
- Species: A. pluangtong

Binomial name
- Aulacospira pluangtong Panha & J. B. Burch, 2004

= Aulacospira pluangtong =

Species of gastropod

Aulacospira pluangtong is a species of small land snail with an operculum, terrestrial pulmonate gastropod mollusc in the family Cyclophoridae.

== Distribution ==
It is endemic to Thailand, occurring on limestone rocks.

== Description ==
(original description) The height of the shell varies between 1.75 mm and 1.82 mm, its diameter between 1.82 mm and 1.93 mm.

The shell is minute, featuring a high spire and a brownish coloration. The protoconch is smooth, while the teleoconch is relatively smooth but marked by uneven growth striae. The final portion of the body whorl is free and projects downward, forming a tuba that terminates in a peristome that is not expanded. The aperture is armed with four teeth: the parietal and columellar lamellae, as well as the upper and lower palatal plicae.

The radula is consistent in form with that of Aulacospira depressa.

Genital system: The atrium is shorter than the vagina. The penis is longer than the epiphallus, with its anterior portion forming a slender tube. The epiphallus connects to the distal end of the penis and is glossy white in appearance. It is longer than the vas deferens, with a slender, cylindrical anterior portion and a central portion that is slightly more bulging than the posterior section.

An epiphallic flagellum is absent. However, a rounded and bulbous epiphallic retractor caecum is present, attached to the posterior portion of the epiphallus. The vas deferens is very long and slender, entering the epiphallus apically. Both the vagina and the free oviduct are cylindrical, though the vagina is shorter than the free oviduct. The gametolytic sac is notably long and cylindrical; its anterior portion connects the vagina and free oviduct, while the posterior portion terminates in a curved knob. The uterus is long and cylindrical, with a very thin prostate gland adhering to its surface. Finally, the hermaphroditic duct is loosely convoluted, and the albumen gland is large and yellowish. A dart apparatus is absent.

== Distribution ==
This species occurs in Thailand on limestome rocks.
