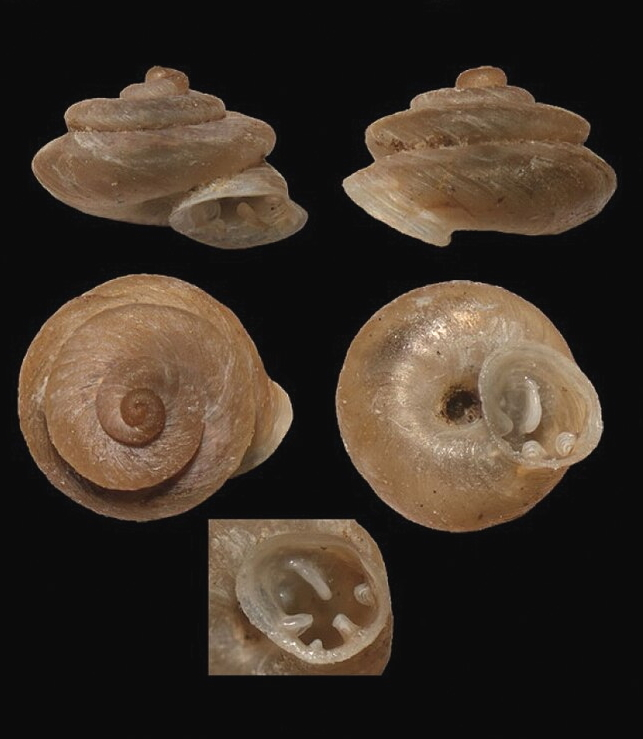
- Shell of Aulacospira panhai

Scientific classification
- Kingdom: Animalia
- Phylum: Mollusca
- Class: Gastropoda
- Order: Stylommatophora
- Family: Hypselostomatidae
- Genus: Aulacospira
- Species: A. panhai

Binomial name
- Aulacospira panhai Dumrongrojwattana, 2008

= Aulacospira panhai =

Species of gastropod

Aulacospira panhai is a species of small land snail with an operculum, terrestrial pulmonate gastropod mollusc in the family Cyclophoridae.

== Distribution ==
It is endemic to Thailand, occurring on limestone rocks.

== Description ==
(original description) The height of the shell varies between 2.47 mm and 2.83 mm, its diameter between 1.45 mm and 1.7 mm.

The shell is minute and semi-depressed, characterized by a distorted spire and a brownish coloration. The protoconch is distinctly granulose, while the teleoconch remains smooth. Structurally, the first two whorls are slightly flattened, whereas the final two whorls are notably large and inflated. The tuba is short and directed downward, terminating in an expanded peristome. The aperture is armed with six teeth. These include the parietal and infraparietal lamellae, the upper and lower palatal plicae, a basal plica, and a columellar lamella. The radula is consistent in form with that of Aulacospira depressa, sharing the same dental morphology and arrangement.

== Distribution ==
This species occurs in Thailand on limestome rocks.
