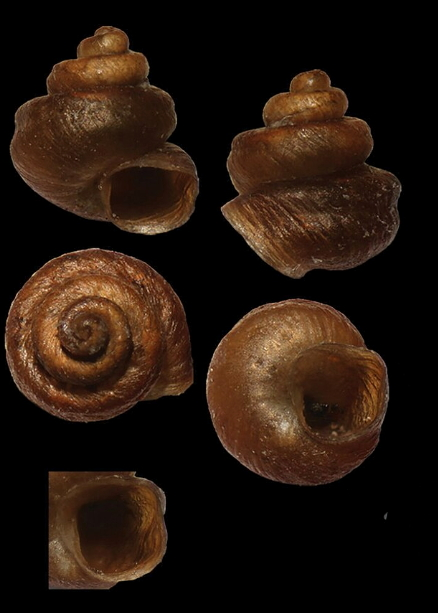
- Shell of Aulacospira tekavongae (holotype)

Scientific classification
- Kingdom: Animalia
- Phylum: Mollusca
- Class: Gastropoda
- Order: Stylommatophora
- Family: Hypselostomatidae
- Genus: Aulacospira
- Species: A. tekavongae

Binomial name
- Aulacospira tekavongae Dumrongrojwattana & Tanmuangpak, 2020

= Aulacospira tekavongae =

Species of gastropod

Aulacospira tekavongae is a species of small land snail with an operculum, terrestrial pulmonate gastropod mollusc in the family Cyclophoridae.

== Distribution ==
It is endemic to Thailand, occurring on limestone rocks.

== Description ==
(original description) The height of the shell attains 2.32 mm, its diameter 2.08 mm.

The shell is minute, conical, and brownish, with 4–4½ whorls. The tuba is very short and projects downward. The protoconch consists of 1¼ whorls and bears granulose wrinkles. The teleoconch is nearly smooth, being sculptured with uneven, oblique growth striae. The suture is deep. The shell is narrowly umbilicate. The spire is high; the first two whorls are rounded, whereas the penultimate and body whorls bear two distinct spiral sulci that extend continuously to the peristome. The peristome is expanded, and the aperture is round and lacks teeth (Fig. 4A).

The radula is as in Aulacospira depressa.

Genital system: The atrium is longer than the vagina. The penis is shorter than the epiphallus, with the anterior portion forming a short, bulging tube. The epiphallus is connected to the distal end of the penis and is longer than the vas deferens. Its anterior portion is slender and cylindrical, while the central portion is slender but more bulging than both the anterior and posterior portions. The epiphallic flagellum is absent. The epiphallic retractor caecum is rather bulging and is attached to the posterior portion of the epiphallus. The vas deferens is long and slender and enters the epiphallus apically. The vagina and free oviduct are cylindrical, with the vagina being shorter than the free oviduct. The gametolytic sac is long and cylindrical; its anterior and central portions are bulging, whereas the posterior portion is slender and ends in a curved knob. The uterus is long and large, with a very thin prostate gland adhering to it. The hermaphroditic duct is loosely convoluted. The albumen gland is large and yellowish. The dart apparatus is absent.

== Distribution ==
This species occurs in Thailand on limestome rocks.
