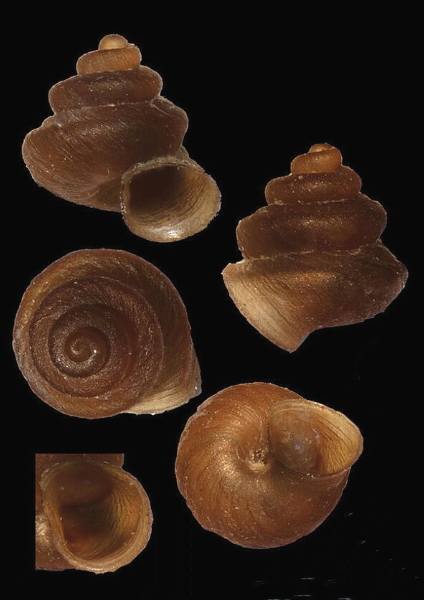
- Shell of Aulacospira vanwalleghemi (holotype)

Scientific classification
- Kingdom: Animalia
- Phylum: Mollusca
- Class: Gastropoda
- Order: Stylommatophora
- Family: Hypselostomatidae
- Genus: Aulacospira
- Species: A. vanwalleghemi

Binomial name
- Aulacospira vanwalleghemi Dumrongrojwattana & Tanmuangpak, 2020

= Aulacospira vanwalleghemi =

Species of gastropod

Aulacospira vanwalleghemi is a species of small land snail with an operculum, terrestrial pulmonate gastropod mollusc in the family Cyclophoridae.

== Distribution ==
It is endemic to Thailand, occurring on limestone rocks.

== Description ==
(original description) The height of the shell attains 3.17 mm, its diameter 3.28 mm.

The shell is minute, conical, and brownish, with 4–4½ whorls. The tuba is very short and projects downward. The protoconch consists of 1¼ whorls and is granulosely wrinkled. The teleoconch is nearly smooth, being sculptured with uneven, oblique growth striae. The suture is deep. The shell is narrowly umbilicate. The spire is high, with the periphery of most whorls rounded; the penultimate and body whorls bear a strong keel at the periphery, which extends continuously to the peristome. The peristome is expanded; the aperture is obliquely oval and lacks teeth (Fig. 5E).

The radula is as in Aulacospira depressa.

Genital system: The atrium is shorter than the vagina. The penis is shorter than the epiphallus, with the anterior and central portions being large and bulging, and the posterior portion curved. The epiphallus is connected to the distal end of the penis and is longer than the vas deferens. Its anterior portion is cylindrical, while the central and posterior portions are also cylindrical, with the distal end curved; the epiphallus is white and glossy. The epiphallic flagellum is absent. The epiphallic retractor caecum is rounded and is connected to the distal part of the epiphallus. The vas deferens is short and slender and enters the epiphallus apically. The vagina and free oviduct are cylindrical, with the vagina being large and shorter than the free oviduct. The gametolytic sac is very long and slender; its anterior portion is bulging and connects between the vagina and the free oviduct, whereas the posterior portion is curved. The uterus is long and large, with a very thin prostate gland adhering to it. The hermaphroditic duct is loosely convoluted. The albumen gland is large and yellowish. The dart apparatus is absent.

== Distribution ==
This species occurs in Thailand on limestome rocks.
