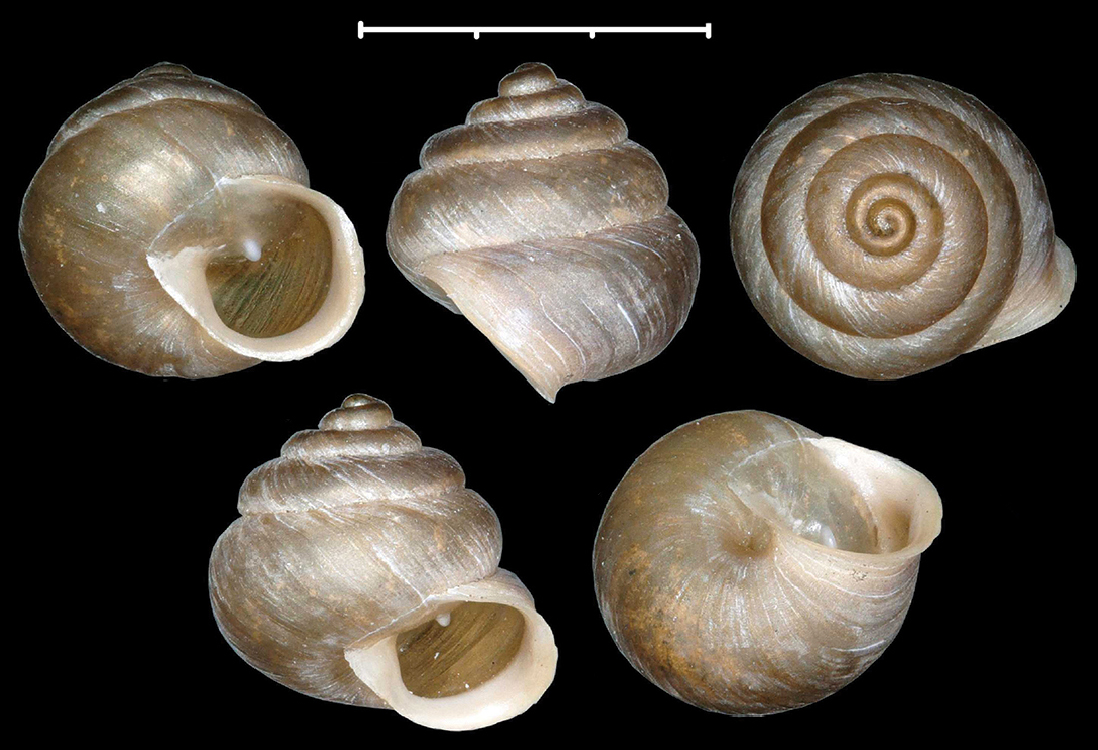
- Shell of Pseudostreptaxis harli

Scientific classification
- Kingdom: Animalia
- Phylum: Mollusca
- Class: Gastropoda
- Order: Stylommatophora
- Family: Hypselostomatidae
- Genus: Pseudostreptaxis
- Species: P. harli

Binomial name
- Pseudostreptaxis harli Páll-Gergely & Schilthuizen, 2019

= Pseudostreptaxis harli =

Species of gastropod

Pseudostreptaxis harli is a species of small land snail with an operculum, terrestrial pulmonate gastropod mollusc in the family Cyclophoridae.

== Description ==
The height of the shell varies between 2.6 mm and 3 mm, its diameter between 2.9 mm and 3.1 mm.

(Original description) The shell is globular, with a width nearly equal to its height (0.95–1.15 ratio). It features bulging whorls separated by a deep suture. In certain specimens, the penultimate whorl is narrowed — a structural eccentricity reminiscent of Pseudostreptaxis azpeitiae. The coloration is quite varied, ranging from a light brownish-grey to a deep, dark purple.

The entire shell comprises 4–4.5 whorls. The protoconch consists of approximately 1.25 whorls and is characterized by a finely granulose texture and spiral striations. Similarly, the teleoconch is finely granulose and marked by irregular wrinkles and a dense, though hardly visible, spiral striation.

The aperture is rounded and set at an oblique angle to the shell axis. Its peristome is thickened and expanded, particularly toward the basal and columellar margins. While the parietal callus is weak—appearing only as a thin lime layer on the penultimate whorl. The parietal lamella (tooth) is prominent. This tooth is elevated, deeply situated, and relatively long; in some individuals, it consists of two tubercles, suggesting it may be homologous with the parieto-angular lamella. No other apertural barriers are present. The umbilicus is open but remarkably narrow, revealing only the body whorl and remaining largely obscured by the expanded edge of the peristome.

== Distribution ==
This species occurs in Palawan, the Philippines on limestome rocks.
