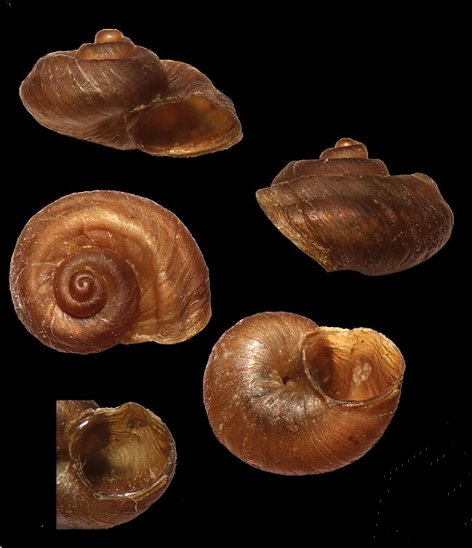
- Shell of Aulacospira nutadhirai

Scientific classification
- Kingdom: Animalia
- Phylum: Mollusca
- Class: Gastropoda
- Order: Stylommatophora
- Family: Hypselostomatidae
- Genus: Aulacospira
- Species: A. nutadhirai

Binomial name
- Aulacospira nutadhirai Dumrongrojwattana & Tanmuangpak, 2020

= Aulacospira nutadhirai =

Species of gastropod

Aulacospira nutadhirai is a species of small land snail with an operculum, terrestrial pulmonate gastropod mollusc in the family Cyclophoridae.

== Distribution ==
It is endemic to Thailand, occurring on limestone rocks.

== Description ==
(original description) The height of the shell attains 1.54 mm, its diameter 2.89 mm.

The shell is minute, helicoid, and brownish, consisting of 4 to 4 ½ whorls. The body whorl is stout, with its last quarter forming a short tuba that projects downward. The protoconch comprises 1 ¼ whorls and is marked by granulose wrinkles, whereas the teleoconch is relatively smooth, featuring uneven and oblique growth striae.

The suture is deep, and the shell is narrowly umbilicate. The spire is low, with the first two whorls being distinctly rounded. Both the penultimate and body whorls are characterized by two shallow spiral sulci that continue uninterrupted to the peristome. The peristome is expanded, and the aperture is circular and lacks teeth entirely.

The radula is consistent with the morphology of Aulacospira depressa.

Genital system: The atrium is shorter than the vagina. The penis is shorter than the epiphallus; its anterior and central portions are large and bulging, while the posterior portion is curved. The epiphallus, which connects to the distal end of the penis, is glossy white and longer than the vas deferens. It is cylindrical throughout its anterior, central, and posterior portions, terminating in a curved distal end.

An epiphallic flagellum is absent, but a rounded epiphallic retractor caecum is present and connected to the distal part of the epiphallus. The vas deferens is short and slender, entering the epiphallus apically. Both the vagina and the free oviduct are cylindrical; the vagina is notably large, yet remains shorter than the free oviduct. The gametolytic sac is long and cylindrical, with an anterior portion connecting the vagina and free oviduct and a swollen posterior portion. The uterus is long and large, with a very thin prostate gland adhering to its surface. Finally, the hermaphroditic duct is loosely convoluted, and the albumen gland is large and yellowish. A dart apparatus is absent.

== Distribution ==
This species occurs in Thailand on limestome rocks.
