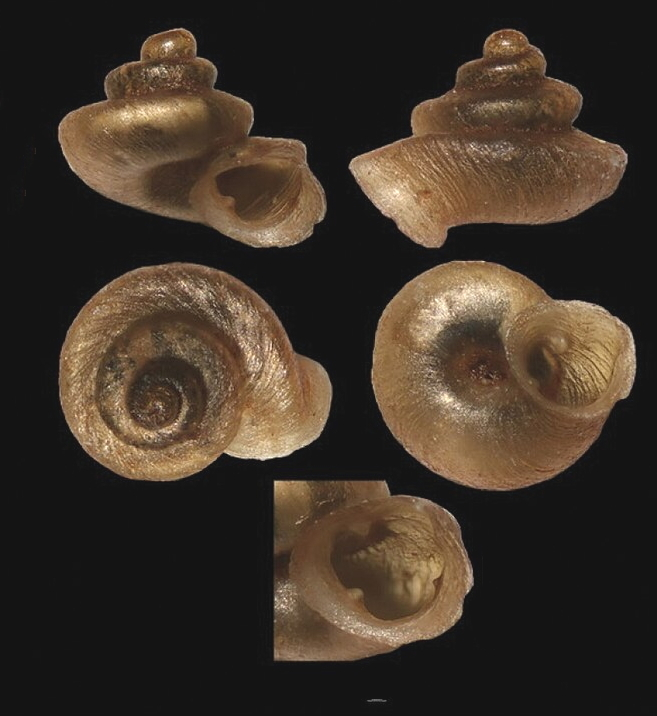
- Shell of Aulacospira smaesarnensis

Scientific classification
- Kingdom: Animalia
- Phylum: Mollusca
- Class: Gastropoda
- Order: Stylommatophora
- Family: Hypselostomatidae
- Genus: Aulacospira
- Species: A. smaesarnensis

Binomial name
- Aulacospira smaesarnensis Dumrongrojwattana, 2008

= Aulacospira smaesarnensis =

Species of gastropod

Aulacospira smaesarnensis is a species of small land snail with an operculum, terrestrial pulmonate gastropod mollusc in the family Cyclophoridae.

== Distribution ==
It is endemic to Thailand, occurring on limestone rocks.

== Description ==
(original description) The height of the shell varies between 2.47 mm and 2.83 mm, its diameter between 1.45 mm and 1.7 mm.

The shell is minute and helicoid, featuring a moderately elevated spire and a brownish coloration. The protoconch is smooth, contrasting with the teleoconch, which has a noticeably rough texture. The body whorl is large and rounded at the periphery. The tuba projects downward, terminating in a peristome that is both thickened and expanded.

The aperture contains poorly developed barriers, consisting of a parietal lamella, a palatal plica, and a columellar lamella. Unlike more heavily armed species, these structures appear less prominent within the opening.

The radula is consistent with the morphology found in Aulacospira depressa, sharing the same dental arrangement and formula.

== Distribution ==
This species occurs in Thailand on limestome rocks.
