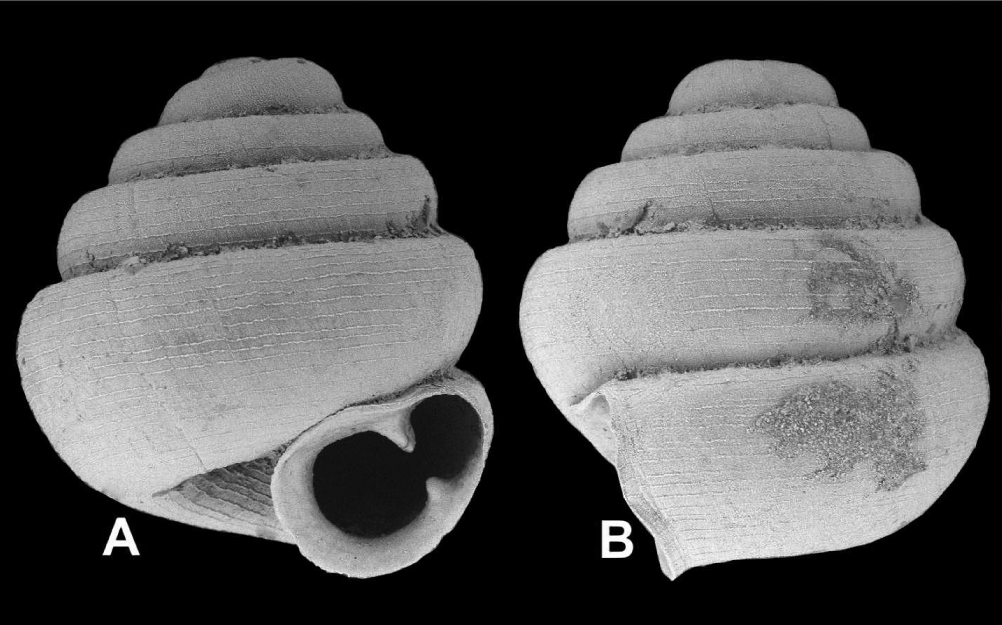

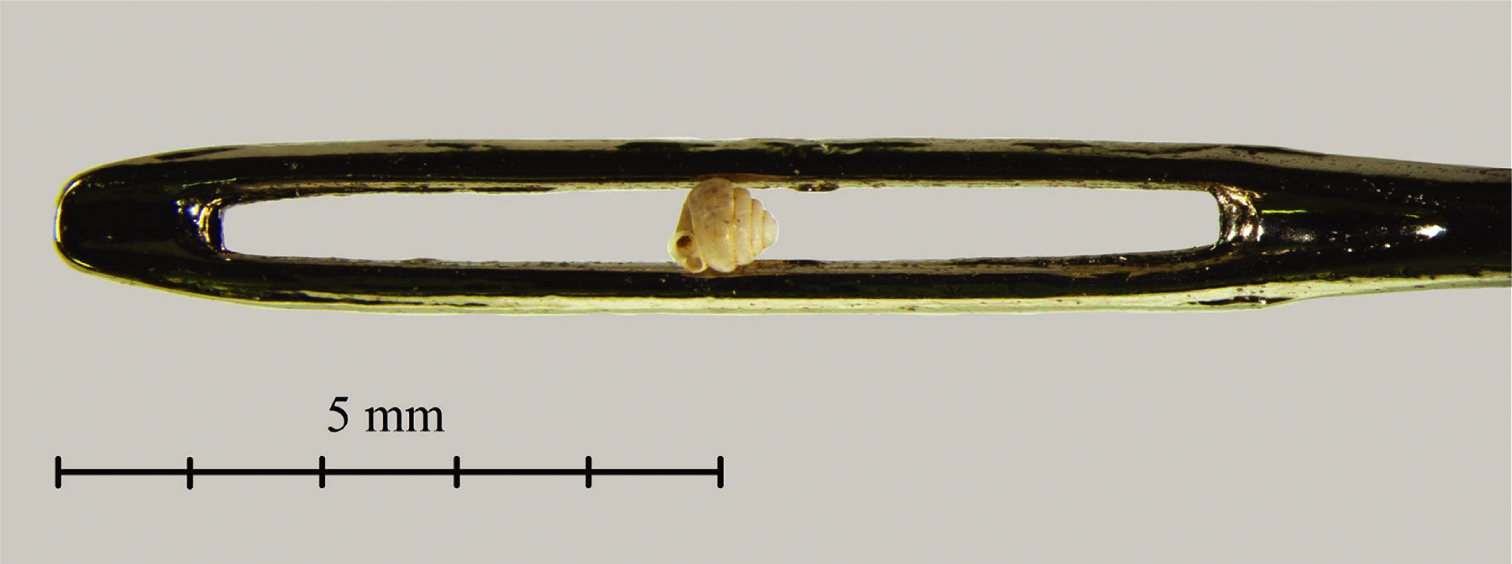
- Two views of the shell (above) and the same shell in the eye of a needle.

Scientific classification
- Kingdom: Animalia
- Phylum: Mollusca
- Class: Gastropoda
- Order: Stylommatophora
- Family: Hypselostomatidae
- Genus: Angustopila
- Species: A. dominikae

Binomial name
- Angustopila dominikae Páll-Gergely & Hunyadi in Páll-Gergely, Hunyadi, Jochum & Asami, 2015

= Angustopila dominikae =

Species of gastropod

Angustopila dominikae is a species of light grey, round, land snails, a terrestrial pulmonate gastropod mollusc in the family Gastrocoptidae. Angustopila dominikae have been found in southern China, and are considered to be one of the world's smallest terrestrial molluscs (the holotype's shell height is 0.86 mm), only surpassed by Acmella nana, which is 0.7 mm in size. This species is a tropical snail found on limestone cliffs.

== Name and previous record status ==
The snails were named after Páll-Gergely's wife, Dominika. It was considered the “world's smallest snail”. However the current record holder, discovered in early 2022, is Angustopila psammion. Angustopila dominikae grows to, at most 0.86 mm. Some unidentified micro-molluscs found in the forests of Argao, Cebu can be smaller in size than Angustopila dominikae, but these species must be further studied before they can stake claim to the title of “Worlds Smallest Snail”.

== Physical characteristics ==
The Angustopila dominikae holotype has a shell that is light grey in color, having 1.5 whorls (repeating spirals or circles) when it is a protoconch. The protoconch is finely pitted and granular and collectively radiates from the nuclear whorl and ceases at the second. This species is also extremely small, approximately 10 can fit in the eye of a needle. Their shells range in size from .6 millimeters to .79 millimeters.

== Discovery ==
This species was first found in a soil sample of limestone rocks at the base of a cliff in Guangxi, China, off the cliffs at the southern edge of Jiaole Cun and is believed to live on the cavern walls of the limestone.

== Diet ==
The diet of these snails consists of feeding on microorganisms like bacteria and fungal filaments. Jochum, a researcher, hypothesizes that the round shape of the shells of this new species may enable them to wedge themselves into tiny cracks in rocks for further food resources. It could also allow them to trap air bubbles in their shell and float in water, in case they become dislodged by rain, and also probably enables them to survive being eaten by a predator.

== Reproduction ==
These snails are most likely thought to be hermaphroditic by researchers, and change their sex based on what other snails are around their habitat.

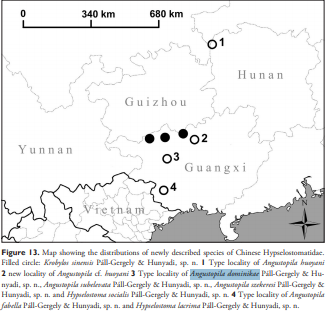

== Conservation status ==
Population size of Angustopila dominikae is currently unknown due to the strenuous methods needed to collect specimens of Angustopila domminika. Researchers have only found the single empty shell of this species. However Angustopila domminikae's conservation status is Critically Endangered (CR), because the species has only been found once, and in one place in the world. This location in China also has potential threats to its natural habitat because of quarrying in this area. However because so little is known of this species there can be no definitive known threats to this species.
