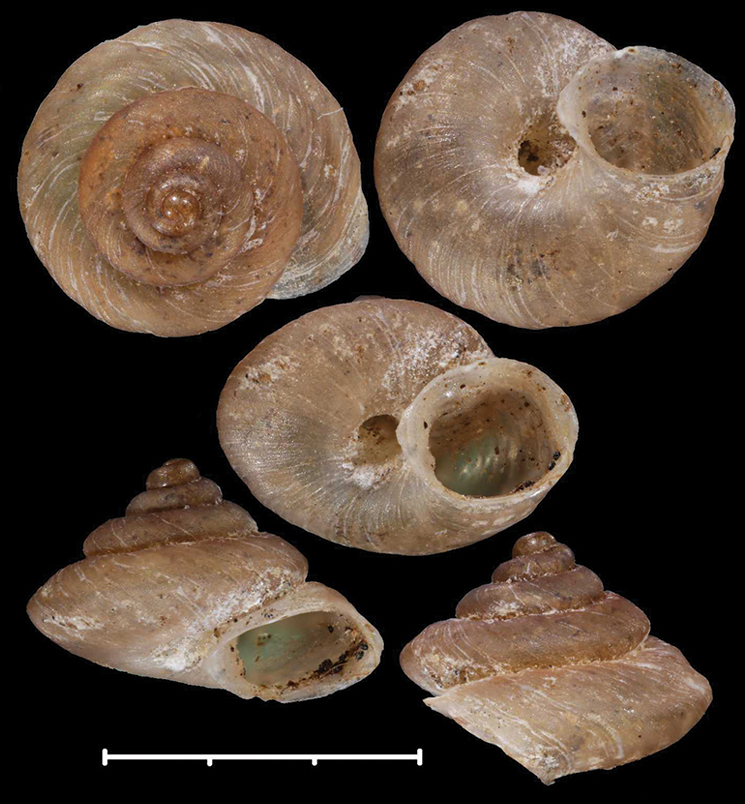
- Shell of Aulacospira hololoma (lectotype)

Scientific classification
- Kingdom: Animalia
- Phylum: Mollusca
- Class: Gastropoda
- Order: Stylommatophora
- Infraorder: Pupilloidei
- Superfamily: Pupilloidea
- Family: Hypselostomatidae
- Genus: Aulacospira; Möllendorff, 1890

Type species
- Helix scalatella Möllendorff, 1888.

Synonyms
- Aulacospira (Micropetasus) Möllendorff, 1890; Helix (Aulacospira) Möllendorff, 1890

= Aulacospira =

Genus of gastropods

Aulacospira is a genus of air-breathing land snails, terrestrial pulmonate gastropod mollusks in the family Hypselostomatidae.

== Description ==
(Original description in Latin) The shell is small, eccentrically umbilicate, and similar in structure to those of the Fruticicola. It is thin, horny, and uniform in color. From its pointed apex, the spire is somewhat scalariform (staircase-like) and carinate (keeled). There are 4 to 5 finely striated whorls, which are flattened and concave due to a spiral groove; on the body whorl, the keel sometimes fades away. The aperture is oblique and generally subcircular, equipped with between 0 and 5 teeth. The peristome is reflected and scarcely thickened.

(Description in 2020 by Dumrongrojwattana, P. & Tanmuangpak, K.) The shell is small—measuring 1.5 mm in height and 2.9 mm in width—and possesses a helicoid shape that is either depressed or triangular, making it notably wider than it is high. Its color is a uniform brown or purplish hue. The apex is prominent, featuring a protoconch that is either smooth or covered with a dense mesh of granular reticulation.

The teleoconch appears relatively smooth, though it is marked by uneven, oblique striae. The spire is slightly concave and, in some specimens, takes on a scalariform appearance. The body whorl can be either keeled or rounded and often features a distinct groove located below the suture. The shell is umbilicate, with an umbilicus that ranges from narrow to moderately narrow. Finally, the aperture is oblique and rounded, typically equipped with zero to five apertural teeth, while the peristome is thin and expanded.

== Species ==
- Aulacospira conica Vermeulen, Phung & Truong, 2007
- Aulacospira depressa Dumrongrojwattana & Panha, 2006
- Aulacospira furtiva Vermeulen & S. Aiken, 2020
- Aulacospira hololoma (Möllendorff, 1887)
- Aulacospira khaobote Dumrongrojwattana & Panha, 2006
- Aulacospira khaopratun Dumrongrojwattana & Panha, 2005
- Aulacospira krobyloides Páll-Gergely & Schilthuizen, 2019
- Aulacospira lampangensis Panha & J. B. Burch, 2002
- Aulacospira lens Páll-Gergely & Auffenberg, 2019
- Aulacospira mucronata (Möllendorff, 1887)
- Aulacospira nutadhirai Dumrongrojwattana & Tanmuangpak, 2020
- Aulacospira panhai Dumrongrojwattana, 2008
- Aulacospira pluangtong Panha & J. B. Burch, 2004
- Aulacospira porrecta Quadras & Möllendorff, 1894
- Aulacospira rhombostoma Quadras & Möllendorff, 1896
- Aulacospira scalatella (Möllendorff, 1888)
- Aulacospira smaesarnensis Panha & J. B. Burch, 2002
- Aulacospira tekavongae Dumrongrojwattana & Tanmuangpak, 2020
- Aulacospira triptycha Quadras & Möllendorff, 1895
- Aulacospira vanwalleghemi Dumrongrojwattana & Tanmuangpak, 2020

Synonyms

- Aulacospira azpeitiae Hidalgo, 1890: synonym of Pseudostreptaxis azpeitiae (Hidalgo, 1890) (superseded combination)
- Aulacospira depressa (Jaeckel, 1950): synonym of Tonkinospira depressa (Jaeckel, 1950) (combination changed subsequently)
- Aulacospira depressiana Dumrongrojwattana & Panha, 2006: synonym of Aulacospira depressa Dumrongrojwattana & Panha, 2006 (incorrect original spelling)

== Distribution ==
The species of this genus oocur in Thailand and the Philippines, living on limestone rocks.
