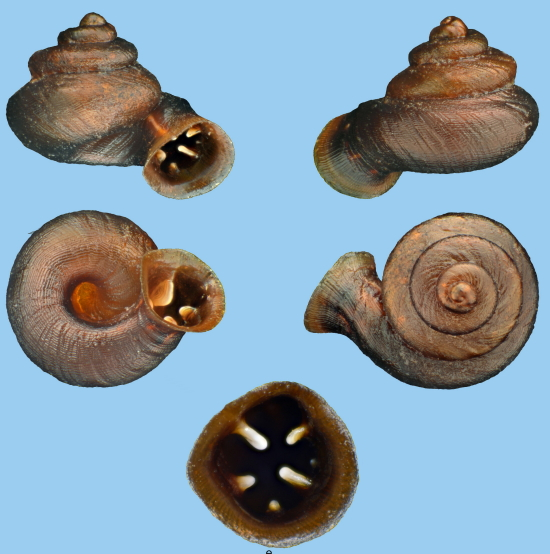
- Shell of Aulacospira furtiva (holotype)

Scientific classification
- Kingdom: Animalia
- Phylum: Mollusca
- Class: Gastropoda
- Order: Stylommatophora
- Family: Hypselostomatidae
- Genus: Aulacospira
- Species: A. furtiva

Binomial name
- Aulacospira furtiva Vermeulen & S. Aiken, 2020

= Aulacospira furtiva =

Species of gastropod

Aulacospira furtiva is a species of small land snail with an operculum, terrestrial pulmonate gastropod mollusc in the family Cyclophoridae.

== Description ==
The height of the shell varies between 2.4 mm and 3.1 mm, its diameter between 3.2 mm and 3.6 mm.

(Original description) The shell is very small, thin, opaque, and dark red-brown. The spire is somewhat depressed-conical, with flat or slightly convex sides; the apex is rounded and does not protrude. The surface is slightly shiny. The whorls are convex; the protoconch and the first teleoconch whorl are rounded, whereas the remaining whorls are obtusely angular at the periphery, becoming shouldered near the aperture and approximately flat above the periphery. The body whorl is slightly rounded below. The edge of the umbilical impression is obtusely angular, and the surface within it is shallowly furrowed. The final part of the body whorl is detached. The suture is deeply impressed.

The protoconch bears very fine, inconspicuous, and well-spaced spiral threads. The teleoconch is sculptured with unevenly spaced, somewhat raised growth lines, some of which develop into inconspicuous, low, obtuse riblets. The spiral sculpture consists of very fine, thin, somewhat flattened threads that are rather densely and somewhat unevenly spaced.

The aperture is free, with the parietal edge distant from the previous whorl, and is slightly tilted downward with respect to the coiling axis. It is approximately circular to obtusely rectangular in shape. The free portion of the spire is slightly narrowed toward the aperture and then expands. The aperture bears 5–6 teeth, all of which are short and originate rather close to the peristome: one distinct, high parietal lamella with an obtusely deltoid profile; one distinctly smaller and more rounded suprapalatalis; one infrapalatalis slightly larger than the suprapalatalis, with or without a tiny, knob-shaped tooth between these palatal teeth; one minute, short basalis; and one almost knob-shaped columellaris. The peristome is thin and gradually spreading.

The umbilicus is open and wide, with fewer than two whorls visible within.

== Distribution ==
It is endemic to Cambodia, occurring on limestone rocks.
