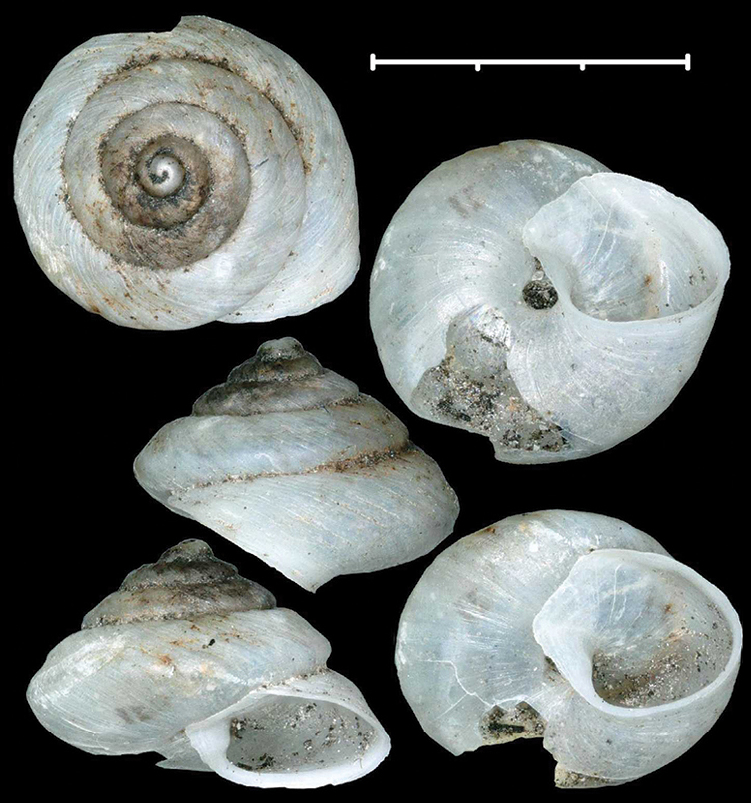
- Shell of Aulacospira krobyloides

Scientific classification
- Kingdom: Animalia
- Phylum: Mollusca
- Class: Gastropoda
- Order: Stylommatophora
- Family: Hypselostomatidae
- Genus: Aulacospira
- Species: A. krobyloides

Binomial name
- Aulacospira krobyloides Páll-Gergely & Schilthuizen, 2019

= Aulacospira krobyloides =

Species of gastropod

Aulacospira krobyloides is a species of small land snail with an operculum, terrestrial pulmonate gastropod mollusc in the family Cyclophoridae.

== Description ==
The height of the shell attains 2.4 mm, its diameter 3.5 mm.

(Original description) The shell is depressed-conical in shape, measuring approximately 1.5 times as wide as it is high. It features a prominent keel at the midpoint of the body whorl, complemented by a subtle, faintly indicated subsutural furrow located between the keel and the suture. While the current specimen is an off-white color, fresh specimens likely exhibit a darker hue.

The entire shell comprises 4.5 whorls. The protoconch is elevated and consists of roughly 1.25 whorls characterized by a finely granulose texture and delicate spiral striations. Similarly, the teleoconch is finely granulose but is marked by irregular wrinkles and dense, fine spiral striae.

The aperture is suboval and sits at a strongly oblique angle to the shell axis. Its peristome is slightly expanded from the parieto-palatal to the parieto-columellar junctions; it is also notably thickened between the keel and the columella. Toward the umbilicus, the peristome expands further, partially obscuring it. A rather robust parietal callus is present as a distinct lime layer on the parietal wall. While a columellar tooth is present, it is merely indicated and blunt; notably, there are no parietal or palatal teeth. The umbilicus itself is very narrow yet remains "perspective," revealing all previous whorls despite being half-covered by the expanded edge of the peristome.

== Distribution ==
This species occurs in Palawan, the Philippines on limestome rocks.
