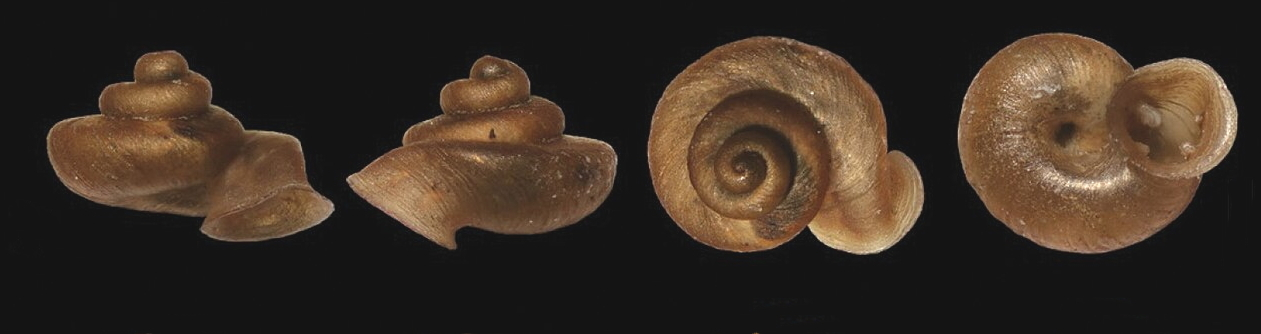
- Shell of Aulacospira lampangensis

Scientific classification
- Kingdom: Animalia
- Phylum: Mollusca
- Class: Gastropoda
- Order: Stylommatophora
- Family: Hypselostomatidae
- Genus: Aulacospira
- Species: A. lampangensis

Binomial name
- Aulacospira lampangensis Panha & J. B. Burch, 2002

= Aulacospira lampangensis =

Species of gastropod

Aulacospira lampangensis is a species of small land snail with an operculum, terrestrial pulmonate gastropod mollusc in the family Cyclophoridae.

== Distribution ==
It is endemic to Thailand.

== Description ==
(original description) The height of the shell varies between 1.6 mm and 1.80 mm, its diameter between 2.0 mm and 2.3 mm.

The shell is minute and depressed, featuring rounded whorls and a moderately high spire. It possesses a brownish coloration, with both the protoconch and the teleoconch appearing smooth. The body whorl is notably large and is characterized by two prominent spiral carinae. The tuba projects downward, terminating in an expanded peristome. The aperture is well-armed, possessing five distinct teeth. These include the columellar and parietal lamellae, as well as the upper and lower palatal plicae and a basal plica.

== Distribution ==
This species occurs in Thailand on limestome rocks.
