= Aulacospira conica =

Scientific classification
- Kingdom: Animalia
- Phylum: Mollusca
- Class: Gastropoda
- Order: Stylommatophora
- Family: Hypselostomatidae
- Genus: Aulacospira
- Species: A. conica

Binomial name
- Aulacospira conica Vermeulen, Phung & Truong, 2007

Species of gastropod

Aulacospira conica is a species of small land snail with an operculum, terrestrial pulmonate gastropod mollusc in the family Cyclophoridae.

== Distribution ==
It is endemic to Cambodia and Vietnam, occurring on limestone rocks.
