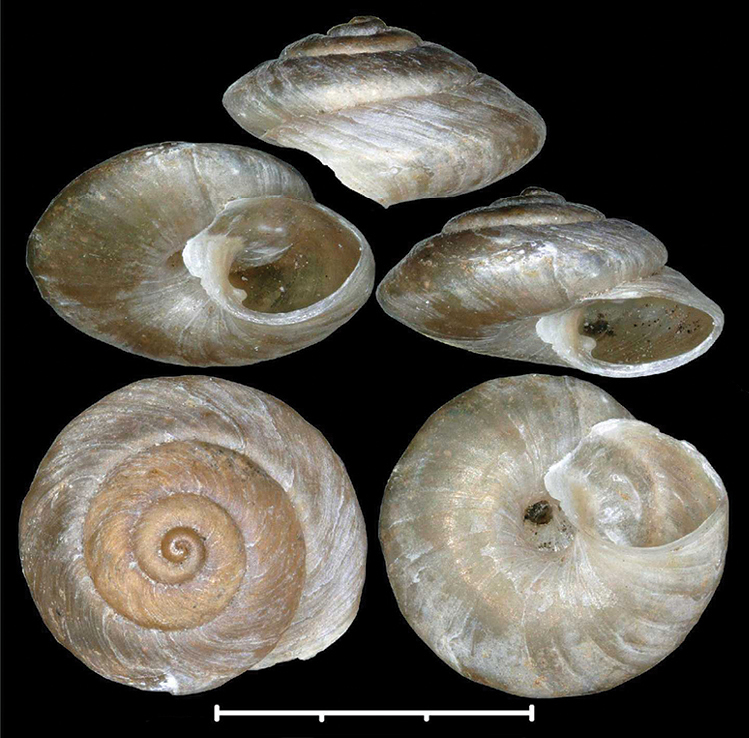
- Shell of Aulacospira lens

Scientific classification
- Kingdom: Animalia
- Phylum: Mollusca
- Class: Gastropoda
- Order: Stylommatophora
- Family: Hypselostomatidae
- Genus: Aulacospira
- Species: A. lens

Binomial name
- Aulacospira lens Páll-Gergely & Auffenberg, 2019

= Aulacospira lens =

Species of gastropod

Aulacospira lens is a species of small land snail with an operculum, terrestrial pulmonate gastropod mollusc in the family Cyclophoridae.

== Description ==
The height of the shell varies between 1.9 mm and 2 mm, its diameter between 3.5 mm and 3.6 mm.

(Original description) The shell is strongly discoid, measuring between 1.7 and 1.9 times as wide as it is high. It is defined by a robust peripheral keel and a shallow subsutural furrow situated between the keel and the suture. The coloration ranges from a light brownish-grey to occasional hints of purple. Interestingly, fresh specimens often have sand or detritus adhered to both the dorsal and ventral surfaces, which likely serves as natural camouflage.

The shell is composed of approximately four whorls. The protoconch consists of about one whorl; it is finely granulose and appears superficially smooth, though very faint spiral striations are visible under magnification. The teleoconch is also finely granulose and marked by weak, irregular wrinkles, though it lacks spiral striae.

The aperture is suboval, featuring a distinct palatal elongation caused by the keel, and is set at a strongly oblique angle to the shell axis. The peristome is sharp along the upper palatal portion above the keel; however, it becomes slightly thickened and reflected between the keel and the columella. Near the umbilicus, the peristome expands to partially cover the opening.

While the parietal callus is generally very weak and often transparent, the columellar tooth is well-developed, blunt, and positioned low on the columella. A relatively long, low parietal lamella is present in the holotype (though absent in subadult specimens), slightly immersed from the parietal callus. The umbilicus is narrow and perspective, revealing all previous whorls despite being partially obscured by the expanded edge of the peristome.

== Distribution ==
This species occurs in South Gigante Island, the Philippines on limestome rocks.
