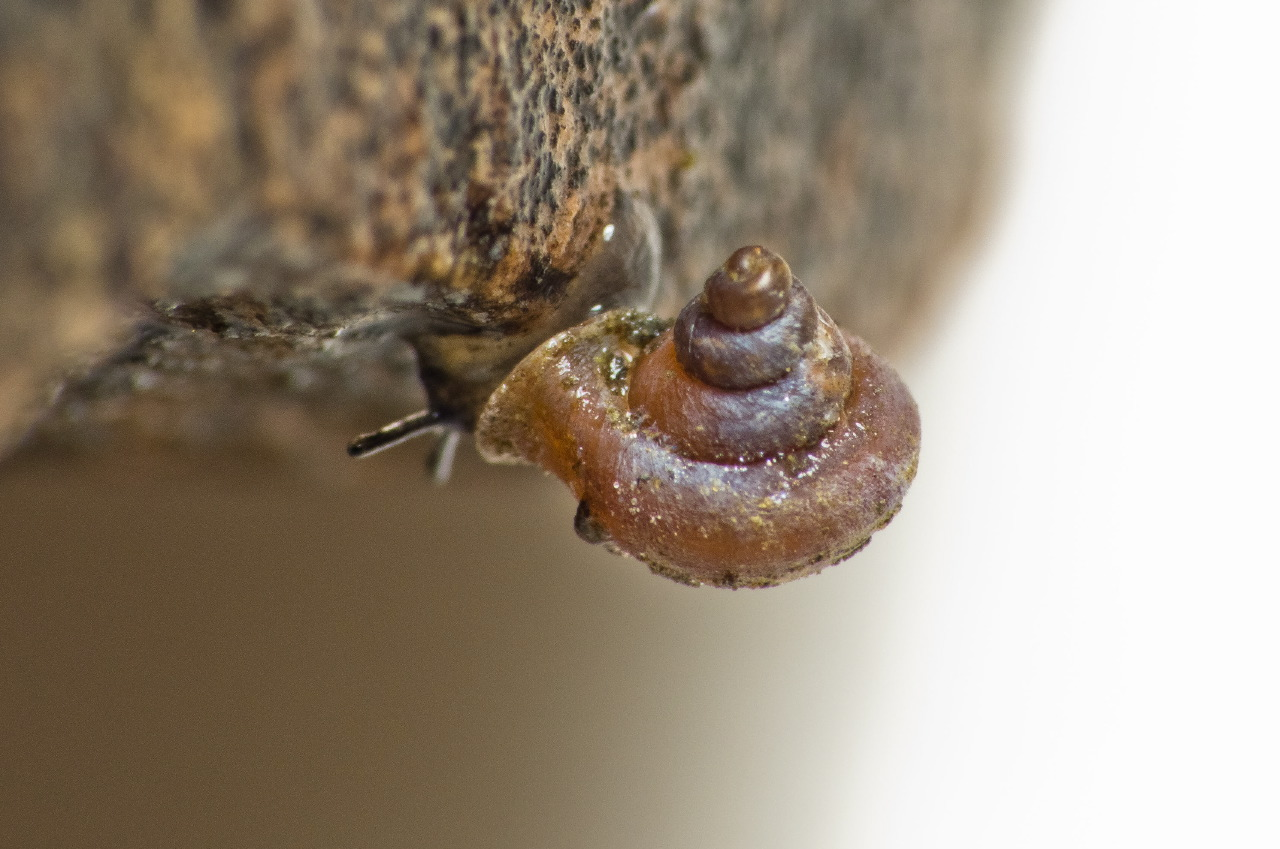

Conservation status
- Near Threatened (IUCN 2.3)

Scientific classification
- Kingdom: Animalia
- Phylum: Mollusca
- Class: Gastropoda
- Order: Stylommatophora
- Family: Hypselostomatidae
- Genus: Hypselostoma
- Species: H. australe

Binomial name
- Hypselostoma australe Odhner, 1917

Synonyms
- Gyliotrachela australis (Odhner, 1917) superseded combination; Gyliotrachela catherina Solem, 1981; Gyliotrachela ningbingia Solem, 1981; Hypselostoma australis Odhner, 1917

= Hypselostoma australe =

Species of gastropod

Hypselostoma australe is a species of small air-breathing land snail, a terrestrial pulmonate gastropod mollusk in the family Hypselostomatidae.

This species is endemic to Australia.
