= Hypselostoma insularum =

Scientific classification
- Kingdom: Animalia
- Phylum: Mollusca
- Class: Gastropoda
- Order: Stylommatophora
- Family: Hypselostomatidae
- Genus: Hypselostoma
- Species: H. insularum

Binomial name
- Hypselostoma insularum Pilsbry, 1908

Species of gastropod

Hypselostoma insularum is a species of small air-breathing land snail, a terrestrial pulmonate gastropod mollusk in the family Vertiginidae, the vertigo snails.

== Distribution ==
The type locality is Yonaguni, Ryukyu Islands, Japan.

It is critically endangered and endangered species.
