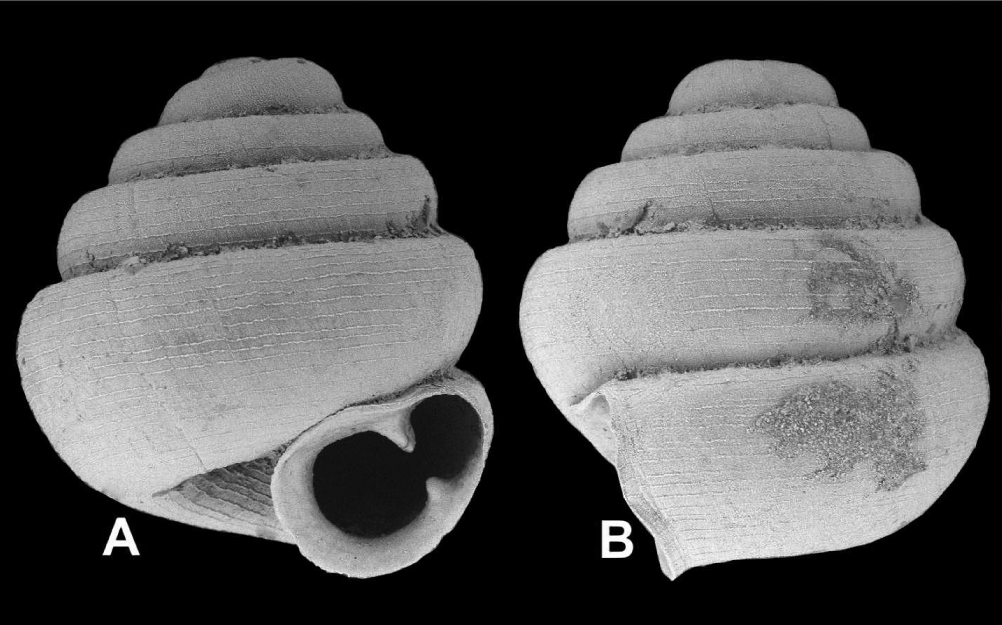
- Angustopila dominikae at MNHN, Parisà

Scientific classification
- Kingdom: Animalia
- Phylum: Mollusca
- Class: Gastropoda
- Order: Stylommatophora
- Infraorder: Pupilloidei
- Superfamily: Pupilloidea
- Family: Hypselostomatidae
- Genus: Angustopila; Jochum, Slapnik & Páll-Gergely in Jochum, Slapnik, Kampschulte, Martels, Heneka & Páll-Gergely, 2014

Type species
- Systenostoma tamlod Panha & Burch, 1999

= Angustopila =

Genus of gastropods

Angustopila is a genus of air-breathing land snails, terrestrial pulmonate gastropod mollusks in the family Hypselostomatidae.

== Species ==
- Angustopila akrodon Páll-Gergely & Hunyadi, 2023
- Angustopila antidomedon Páll-Gergely & Hunyadi, 2023
- Angustopila apiaria Páll-Gergely & Hunyadi, 2023
- Angustopila apiostoma Páll-Gergely & Vermeulen, 2023
- Angustopila apokritodon Páll-Gergely & Hunyadi, 2023
- Angustopila babel Páll-Gergely & Vermeulen, 2023
- Angustopila bathyodon Páll-Gergely & Hunyadi, 2023
- Angustopila bidentata Páll-Gergely & Jochum, 2023
- Angustopila cavicola Páll-Gergely & Dumrongrojwattana, 2023
- Angustopila cicatricosa Páll-Gergely & Vermeulen, 2023
- Angustopila concava (Thompson & Upatham, 1997)
- Angustopila coprologos Páll-Gergely, Jochum & Hunyadi, 2022
- Angustopila dominikae Páll-Gergely & Hunyadi in Páll-Gergely, Hunyadi, Jochum & Asami, 2015
- Angustopila elevata (Thompson & Upatham, 1997)
- Angustopila erawanica Páll-Gergely & Dumrongrojwattana, 2023
- Angustopila fabella Páll-Gergely & Hunyadi in Páll-Gergely, Hunyadi, Jochum & Asami, 2015
- Angustopila fratermajor Páll-Gergely & Vermeulen, 2023
- Angustopila fraterminor Páll-Gergely & Vermeulen, 2023
- Angustopila gracilis Páll-Gergely & Hunyadi, 2023
- Angustopila halongensis Páll-Gergely & Vermeulen, 2023
- Angustopila huoyani Jochum, Slapnik & Páll-Gergely in Jochum, Slapnik, Kampschulte, Martels, Heneka & Pall-Gergely, 2014
- Angustopila hyron Páll-Gergely & Vermeulen, 2023
- Angustopila maasseni Páll-Gergely & Vermeulen, 2023
- Angustopila majuscula Páll-Gergely & Hunyadi, 2023
- Angustopila margaritarion Páll-Gergely & Hunyadi, 2023
- Angustopila megastoma Páll-Gergely & Vermeulen, 2023
- Angustopila milium (W. H. Benson, 1853)
- Angustopila occidentalis Páll-Gergely & Hunyadi, 2023
- Angustopila oostoma Páll-Gergely & Vermeulen, 2023
- Angustopila pallgergelyi Dumrongrojwattana, Chuenit & Wongkamhaeng, 2021
- Angustopila papaver Páll-Gergely & Hunyadi, 2023
- Angustopila parallela Páll-Gergely & Hunyadi, 2023
- Angustopila prolixa Páll-Gergely & Hunyadi, 2023
- Angustopila psammion Páll-Gergely, Vermeulen & Ankervan, 2022
- Angustopila pusilla Páll-Gergely & Hunyadi, 2023
- Angustopila pustulata Páll-Gergely & Hunyadi, 2023
- Angustopila quadridens Páll-Gergely & Vermeulen, 2023
- Angustopila rara Páll-Gergely & Hunyadi, 2023
- Angustopila reticulata Páll-Gergely & Hunyadi, 2023
- Angustopila somsaki Páll-Gergely & Hunyadi, 2023
- Angustopila steffeki Páll-Gergely & Grego, 2023
- Angustopila szekeresi Páll-Gergely & Hunyadi in Páll-Gergely, Hunyadi, Jochum & Asami, 2015
- Angustopila tamlod (Panha & Burch, 1999)
- Angustopila tetradon Páll-Gergely & Hunyadi, 2023
- Angustopila thersites Páll-Gergely & Vermeulen, 2023
- Angustopila tonkinospiroides Páll-Gergely & Vermeulen, 2023
- Angustopila tridentata Páll-Gergely & Hunyadi, 2023
- Angustopila tweediei Páll-Gergely & Hunyadi, 2023
- Angustopila uvula Páll-Gergely & Hunyadi, 2023
- Angustopila vandevenderi Páll-Gergely & Jochum, 2023
- Angustopila vitrina Páll-Gergely & Hunyadi, 2023
- Angustopila vomer Páll-Gergely & Hunyadi, 2023
- Angustopila werneri Páll-Gergely & Hunyadi, 2023

Synonyms

- Angustopila neglecta (Benthem-Jutting, 1961): synonym of Clostophis neglectus (van Benthem Jutting, 1961) (unaccepted combination)
- Angustopila singuladentis Inkhavilay & Panha, 2016: synonym of Angustopila fabella Páll-Gergely & Hunyadi, 2015 (junior subjective synonym)
- Angustopila stochi Páll-Gergely & Jochum, 2017: synonym of Clostophis stochi (Páll-Gergely & Jochum, 2017) (original combination)
- Angustopila subelevata Páll-Gergely & Hunyadi in Páll-Gergely, Hunyadi, Jochum & Asami, 2015: synonym of Angustopila elevata (F. G. Thompson & Upatham, 1997) (junior subjective synonym, junior synonym)
