= Hypselostoma serpa =

Conservation status
- Critically Endangered (IUCN 3.1)

Scientific classification
- Kingdom: Animalia
- Phylum: Mollusca
- Class: Gastropoda
- Order: Stylommatophora
- Family: Hypselostomatidae
- Genus: Hypselostoma
- Species: H. serpa

Binomial name
- Hypselostoma serpa (van Benthem-Jutting, 1950)

Synonyms
- Bensonella serpa (van Benthem Jutting, 1950); Gyliotrachela tarutao (Panha & J. B. Burch, 2002); Paraboysidia serpa van Benthem Jutting, 1950; Paraboysidia tarutao Panha & J. B. Burch, 2002

Species of gastropod

Hypselostoma serpa is a species of terrestrial vertiginid gastropod endemic to the karst of Bukit Baling, Malaysia.

== Morphology and diagnostic description ==
Shell relatively small, with a conical spire issuing from a rather broad base. The wide aperture is not disjunct, but adnate to the preceding whorl. Shell is reddish-brown and opaque. First 1.5 whorls lack ornamentation, progressing into weakly striated and ribbed subsequent ultimate whorls. Last whorl (of 5) ends straight or partially descending. Whorl peripheries rounded except for a conspicuous peripheral keel on the ultimate whorl, with a similar keel encircling the umbilicus. Umbilicus rather wide and open. Aperture wide, with separated angular and parietal lamellae; columella, upper and lower palatal teeth large, infraparietal, basal and interpalatal teeth small. Peristome continuous, thickened and expanded. Height: 2.9-3.4 mm, Breadth: 2.6-3.1 mm, Apertural height: 1.4-1.6 mm [among type series and references of Benthem-Jutting, 1949]. H. serpa resembles Gyliotrachela modesta in general form, but the latter differs in its disjunct ultimate whorl and lesser-developed apertural armature.

== Distribution and threats ==
Hypselostoma serpa is endemic to the limestone karst of Bukit Baling, Kedah, Malaysia. It occurs among lowland dipterocarp woodlands which are threatened by desiccation (which has been tied to population declines in karst-endemic fauna), and possibly pollution from quarrying operations or changing forest structure. Due to the extremely narrow and imperiled endemic site of this species, it has been declared Critically Endangered by the IUCN under criteria B1ab(i,iii)+2ab(i,iii).
