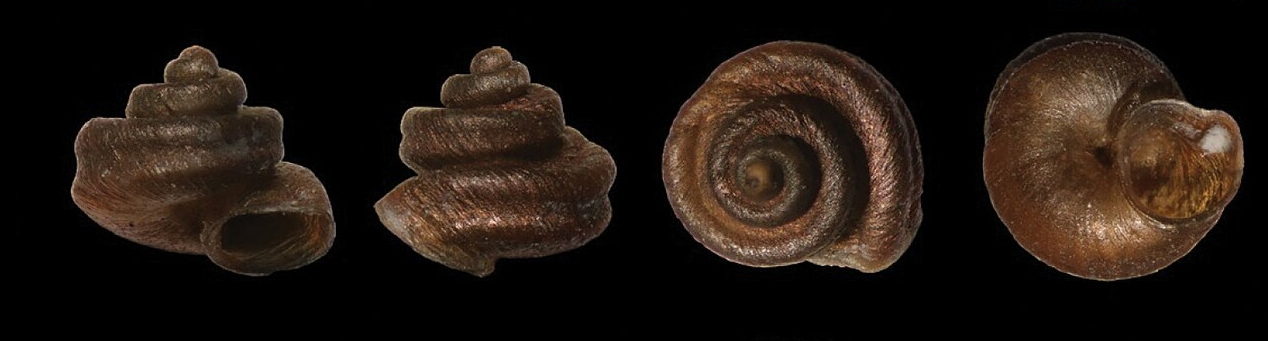
- Shell of Aulacospira khaobote

Scientific classification
- Kingdom: Animalia
- Phylum: Mollusca
- Class: Gastropoda
- Order: Stylommatophora
- Family: Hypselostomatidae
- Genus: Aulacospira
- Species: A. khaobote

Binomial name
- Aulacospira khaobote Dumrongrojwattana & Panha, 2006

= Aulacospira khaobote =

Species of gastropod

Aulacospira khaobote is a species of small land snail with an operculum, terrestrial pulmonate gastropod mollusc in the family Cyclophoridae.

== Description ==
(original description) The height of the shell varies between 1.59 mm and 1.89 mm, its diameter between 1.91 mm and 2.38 mm.

The shell is minute and triangular in shape, featuring a high spire and a brownish coloration. Both the protoconch and the teleoconch are smooth. The body whorl is characterized by a broad sulcus (groove), while the tuba (the final part of the body whorl when it becomes detached from the previous whorls) remains very short. Unlike related species, the peristome is not expanded, and the aperture lacks teeth entirely.

== Distribution ==
This species occurs in Thailand on limestome rocks.
