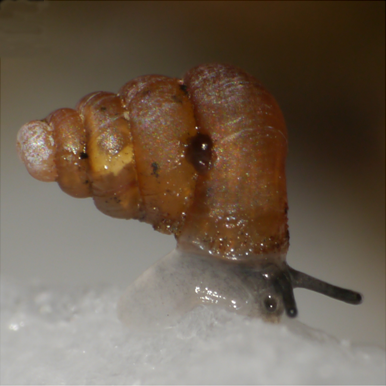
- A live Bensonella plicidens

Scientific classification
- Kingdom: Animalia
- Phylum: Mollusca
- Class: Gastropoda
- Order: Stylommatophora
- Family: Hypselostomatidae
- Genus: Bensonella
- Species: B. plicidens

Binomial name
- Bensonella plicidens (Benson, 1849)

Synonyms
- Pupa plicidens Benson, 1849 (original combination)

= Bensonella plicidens =

Species of land snail

Bensonella plicidens is a species of very small air-breathing land snail, a terrestrial pulmonate gastropod mollusc in the family Hypselostomatidae.

== Distribution ==
This species occurs in Japan.

== Description ==
The width of the shell is 2 mm. The aperture of the shell is protruded. There are 13-15 denticles within the aperture about 400 μm from the lip.

Views of a shell of Bensonella plicidens:

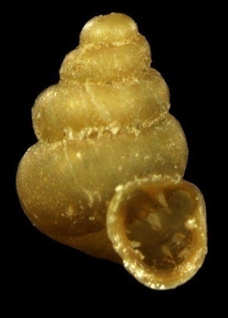
apertural view

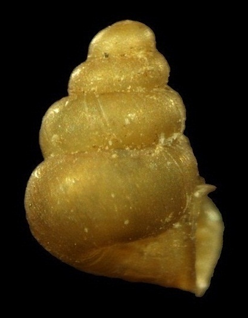
left lateral view

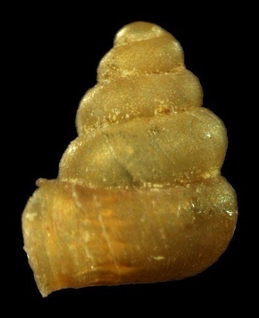
right lateral view

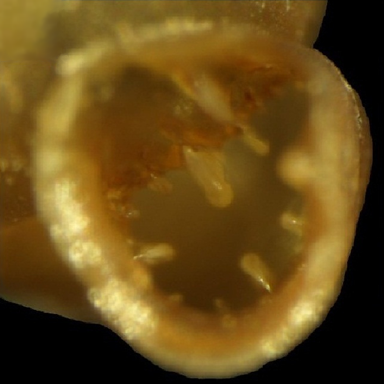
detail of the aperture

== Ecology ==
Potential predators of Bensonella plicidens includes a carnivorous snail Sinoennea iwakawa. Indoennea bicolor is a predator of Bensonella plicidens in laboratory conditions.
