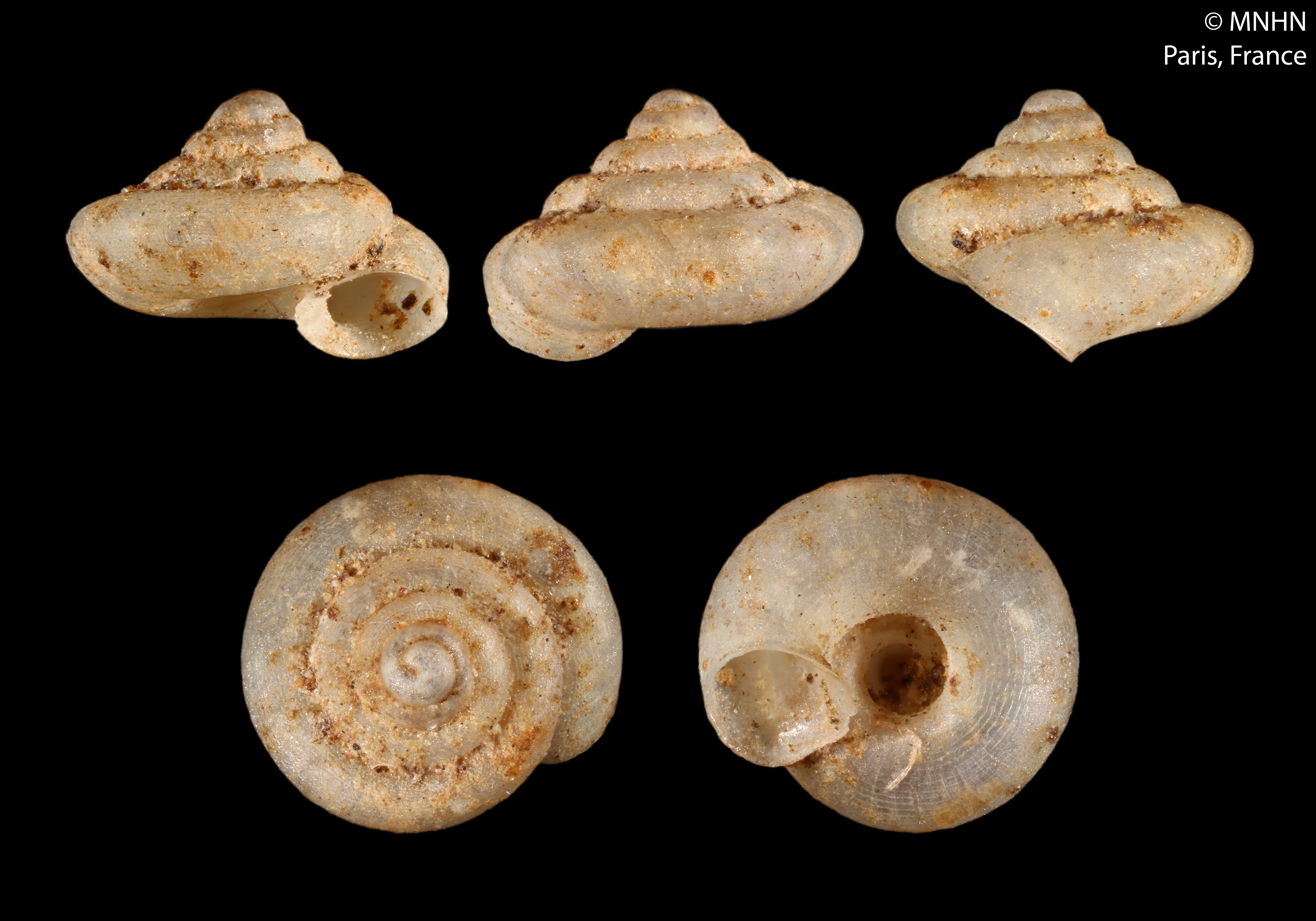
- Shell of Tonkinospira defixa (syntype at MNHN, Paris)

Scientific classification
- Kingdom: Animalia
- Phylum: Mollusca
- Class: Gastropoda
- Order: Stylommatophora
- Infraorder: Pupilloidei
- Superfamily: Pupilloidea
- Family: Hypselostomatidae
- Genus: Tonkinospira; Jochum, Slapnik & Páll-Gergely, 2014

Type species
- Helix (Systenostoma) pauperrima Bavay & Dautzenberg, 1909

Synonyms
- Helix (Systenostoma) Bavay & Dautzenberg, 1909 (original rank); Systenostoma Bavay & Dautzenberg, 1909 (Invalid: junior homonym of Systenostoma Marsson, 1887 [Bryozoa]; Tonkinospira is a replacement name)

= Tonkinospira =

Genus of gastropods

Tonkinospira is a genus of air-breathing land snails, terrestrial pulmonate gastropod mollusks in the family Hypselostomatidae.

== Species ==
- Tonkinospira chytrophora (Mabille, 1887)
- Tonkinospira crassicostata Páll-Gergely & Grego, 2019
- Tonkinospira danangensis Páll-Gergely & Grego, 2019
- Tonkinospira defixa (Bavay & Dautzenberg, 1912)
- Tonkinospira depressa (Jaeckel, 1950)
- Tonkinospira pauperrima (Bavay & Dautzenberg, 1909)
- Tonkinospira pulverea (Bavay & Dautzenberg, 1909)
- Tonkinospira raxajacki Páll-Gergely & Grego, 2019
- Tonkinospira suturata Páll-Gergely & Grego, 2019
- Tonkinospira tomasini Páll-Gergely & Jochum, 2017
- Tonkinospira triangulata Páll-Gergely & Grego, 2019
