= Angustopila psammion =

Scientific classification
- Kingdom: Animalia
- Phylum: Mollusca
- Class: Gastropoda
- Order: Stylommatophora
- Family: Hypselostomatidae
- Genus: Angustopila
- Species: A. psammion

Binomial name
- Angustopila psammion Páll-Gergely, Vermeulen & Anker. 2022

Species of snail

Angustopila psammion is a species of land snail belonging to the subfamily Hypselostomatinae of the family Gastrocoptidae. It was described in 2022.

This species was discovered by scientists scrutinising a small pothole-like cave located in northern Vietnam, according to the original description published in Contributions to Zoology. According to National Geographic, this is the smallest species of land snail ever found. This species' shell measures 0.6 millimeters in diameter. In comparison to other land snails in its family, the Angustopila psammion has a smaller parietal tooth and a shorter spire, however it has a much wider umbilicus.

== Etymology ==
"Psammion (ψαμμιών)" derives from the ancient Greek word for "grain of sand."
