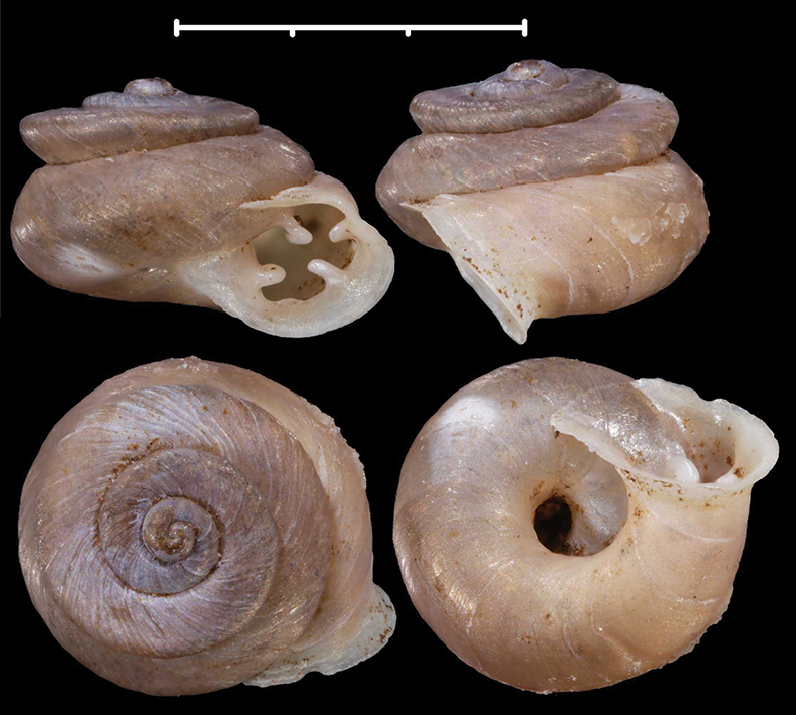
- Shell of Pseudostreptaxis azpeitiae (lectotype)

Scientific classification
- Kingdom: Animalia
- Phylum: Mollusca
- Class: Gastropoda
- Order: Stylommatophora
- Infraorder: Pupilloidei
- Superfamily: Pupilloidea
- Family: Hypselostomatidae
- Genus: Pseudostreptaxis; Möllendorff, 1890

Type species
- Helix (Aulacospira) azpeitiae Hidalgo, 1890

Synonyms
- Aulacospira (Pseudostreptaxis) Möllendorff, 1890 (original rank)

= Pseudostreptaxis =

Genus of gastropods

Pseudostreptaxis is a genus of air-breathing land snails, terrestrial pulmonate gastropod mollusks in the family Hypselostomatidae.

== Description ==
(Original description in Latin) The penultimate whorl is distinctly deviant (offset from the main axis), while the body whorl is not keeled but is instead rounded and smooth. The aperture is equipped with five teeth. The peristome is not continuous, featuring margins that converge toward one another rather than forming a complete ring.

(Description in 2019) The shell is globular in form, featuring a body whorl that is either rounded or marked by a smoothed peripheral angle. The penultimate whorl may be rounded, narrowed, or keeled, often resulting in a streptaxoid (asymmetrical or "twisted") shell shape. The protoconch is characterized by spiral striations, while the teleoconch exhibits a texture of fine spiral striae overlaid with irregular growth wrinkles.

The aperture remains adnate, being firmly attached to the penultimate whorl. The parietal callus is weak, and the peristome is nearly discontinuous. Depending on the specimen, the apertural barriers (internal teeth or lamellae) range in number from one to five. Finally, the umbilicus varies in width, appearing either narrow or relatively wide.

== Distribution ==
These species are endemic to the Philippines. -

== Species ==
- Pseudostreptaxis azpeitiae (Hidalgo, 1890)
- Pseudostreptaxis harli Páll-Gergely & Schilthuizen, 2019
