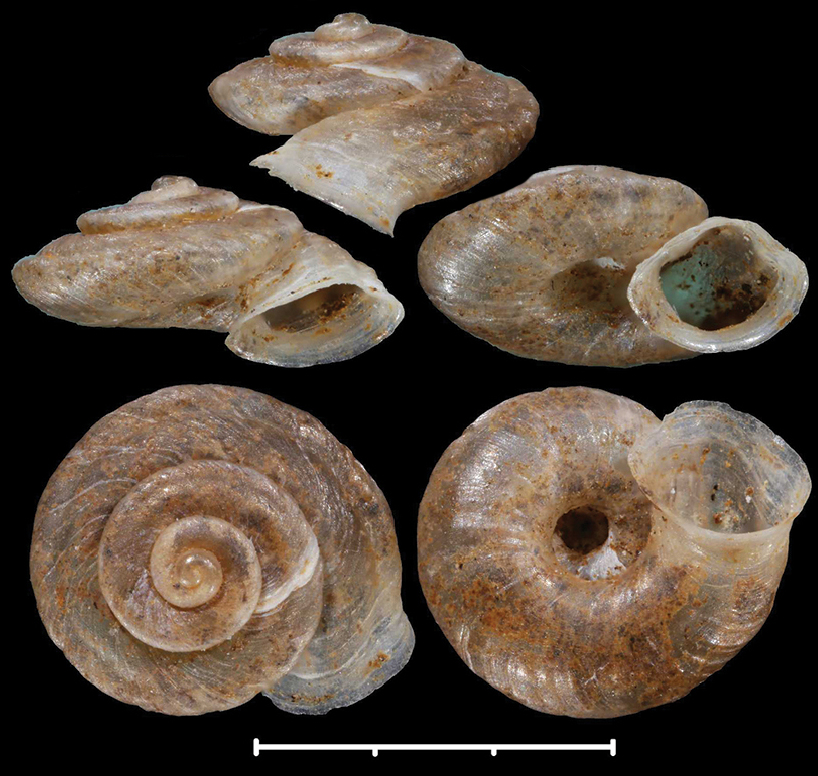
- Shell of Aulacospira porrecta

Scientific classification
- Kingdom: Animalia
- Phylum: Mollusca
- Class: Gastropoda
- Order: Stylommatophora
- Family: Hypselostomatidae
- Genus: Aulacospira
- Species: A. porrecta

Binomial name
- Aulacospira porrecta Quadras & Möllendorff, 1894

Synonyms
- Aulacospira (Micropetasus) porrecta Quadras & Möllendorff, 1894 (original subgenus is a synonym); Aulacospira (Aulacospira) porrecta Zilch, 1984

= Aulacospira porrecta =

Species of gastropod

Aulacospira porrecta is a species of small land snail with an operculum, terrestrial pulmonate gastropod mollusc in the family Cyclophoridae.

== Description ==
The height of the shell varies between 1.5 mm and 1.6 mm, its diameter between 2.8 mm and 3.3 mm.

(Original description) The shell is openly umbilicated (indicating a wide opening at the base, typically allowing a clear view of the internal winding of the whorls), depressed-conoid in shape, and thin in substance. It is finely striated and possesses a brownish-horn coloration. The spire is shortly conoid and distinctly stepped.

There are four whorls that are somewhat flattened and feature an obtuse, only slightly prominent keel. Just above this keel, the surface is lightly grooved. The body whorl is slightly convex at the base; at the front, it is briefly deflected and becomes detached from the rest of the shell.

The aperture is diagonal and ellipsoidal in shape. The peristome is continuous (this means the lip of the aperture forms a complete, unbroken ring) and is very briefly expanded on all sides.

(Description in 2019) The shell is strongly flattened and keeled, featuring a body whorl marked by a slight subsutural furrow on its dorsal side. The protoconch is characterized by spiral striations, while the teleoconch is more rugged, exhibiting rough wrinkles overlaid with fine spiral striae.

The aperture is entirely free from the penultimate whorl and is equipped with four denticles: two palatal, one parietal, and one columellar.

== Distribution ==
This species occurs in Luzon Island, the Philippines on limestome rocks.
