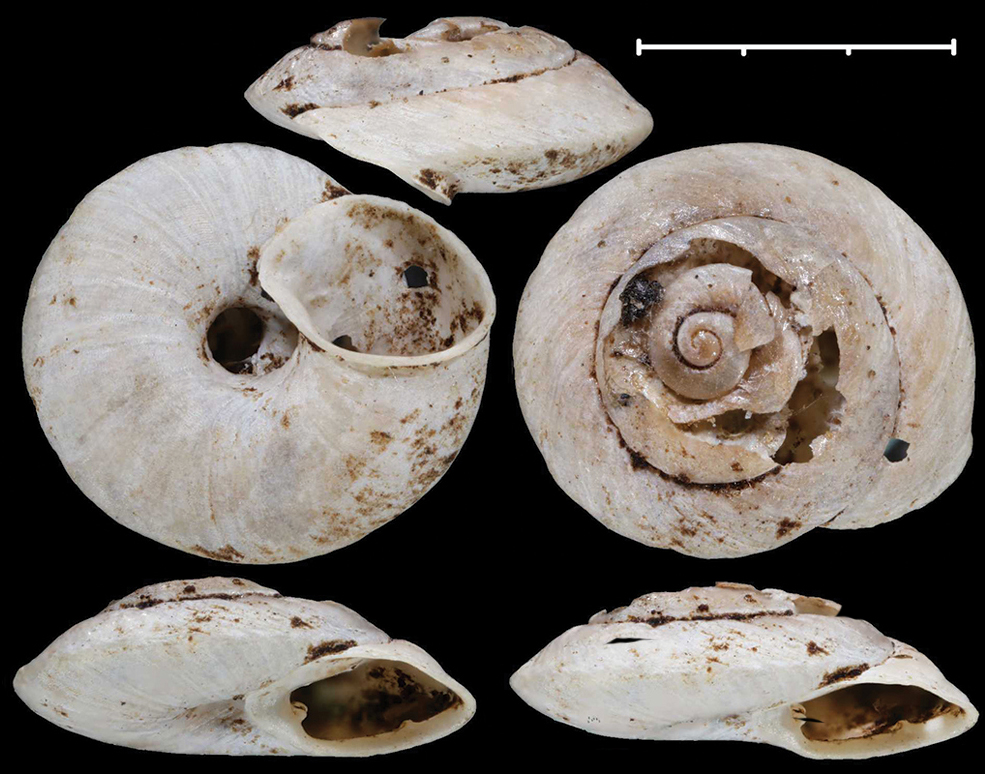
- Shell of Aulacospira triptycha

Scientific classification
- Kingdom: Animalia
- Phylum: Mollusca
- Class: Gastropoda
- Order: Stylommatophora
- Family: Hypselostomatidae
- Genus: Aulacospira
- Species: A. triptycha

Binomial name
- Aulacospira triptycha Quadras & Möllendorff, 1895

Synonyms
- Aulacospira (Aulacospira) triptycha Zilch, 1984

= Aulacospira triptycha =

Species of gastropod

Aulacospira triptycha is a species of small land snail with an operculum, terrestrial pulmonate gastropod mollusc in the family Cyclophoridae.

== Description ==
The height of the shell attains 1.8 mm, its diameter 4.5 mm.

(Original description in Latin) The shell is somewhat openly umbilicated, discoid in shape, and thin in substance. It is delicately sculpted with arched, fold-like striae and is likely horn-colored. The spire is shortly conoid and somewhat stepped.There are 4 1/2 whorls that are flattened and slightly detached at the deep suture. The body whorl is obtusely keeled at the periphery; it is lightly indented above the keel and relatively flat at the base. The aperture is nearly horizontal and obliquely oval in shape. It is narrowed by three teeth: one on the parietal wall, one on the base, and one horizontal, lamelliform tooth on the columella. The peristome is continuous and is pressed against the preceding whorl at the top. The upper margin is straight, while the outer and basal margins are briefly expanded, and the columellar margin is slightly reflected.

(Description in 2019) The shell is discoidal and features a strong keel at its periphery. Along the final half-whorl, a slight subsutural furrow is present on the dorsal side. The protoconch is smooth, transitioning into a teleoconch characterized by rough wrinkles and fine spiral striations.

The aperture is equipped with both a columellar and a palatal tooth. Unlike several related species, the aperture in this form remains adnate, meaning it is firmly attached to the penultimate whorl rather than becoming detached.

== Distribution ==
This species occurs in Masbate Island, the Philippines on limestome rocks.
