= Hypselostoma =

Scientific classification
- Kingdom: Animalia
- Phylum: Mollusca
- Class: Gastropoda
- Order: Stylommatophora
- Family: Hypselostomatidae
- Genus: Hypselostoma; Benson, 1856

Synonyms
- Anthroapiculus Panha & J. B. Burch, 2002 (incorrect subsequent spelling); Antroapiculus Panha & J. B. Burch, 2002 superseded combination; Boysidia (Dasypupa) F. G. Thompson & Dance, 1983 junior subjective synonym; Gyliauchen Pilsbry, 1917 (invalid: junior homonym of Gyliauchen Nicoll, 1915 [Plathelminthes]; Gyliotrachela is a replacement name); Gyliotrachela Tomlin, 1930 junior subjective synonym; Tanystoma W. H. Benson, 1856 (Invalid: junior homonym of Tanystoma Motschoulsky, 1845 [Coleoptera]; Hypselostoma is a replacement name)

Genus of gastropods

Hypselostoma is a genus of very small air-breathing land snails, terrestrial pulmonate gastropod mollusks in the family Hypselostomatidae, the whorl snails.

Some species have the aperture of the shell on a trumpet-shaped extension.

== Species ==
Species within the genus Hypselostoma include:

- Hypselostoma adela F. G. Thompson & Upatham, 1997
- Hypselostoma aenigma Gojšina, Grego & Páll-Gergely, 2025
- Hypselostoma annamiticum Möllendorff, 1900
- Hypselostoma aquila Gojšina, Hunyadi & Páll-Gergely, 2025
- Hypselostoma aunglini (Tongkerd & Panha, 2024)
- Hypselostoma australe Odhner, 1917
- Hypselostoma benetuitum Vermeulen, Luu, Theary & Anker, 2019
- Hypselostoma bensonianum Blanford, 1863
- Hypselostoma bubalus Gojšina, Hunyadi & Páll-Gergely, 2025
- Hypselostoma burchi Panha, 1997
- Hypselostoma cambodjense Van Benthem Jutting, 1962
- Hypselostoma chatnareeae (Panha & J. B. Burch, 2003)
- Hypselostoma chaunosalpinx (Vermeulen, Luu, Theary & Anker, 2019)
- Hypselostoma chedi Panha, 1998
- Hypselostoma circumcarinatum Gojšina, Auffenberg & Páll-Gergely, 2025
- Hypselostoma coriaceum Gojšina & Páll-Gergely, 2025
- Hypselostoma concreta van Benthem Jutting, 1949
- Hypselostoma crossei (Morlet, 1886)
- Hypselostoma cucumense Panha, 1997
- Hypselostoma cultura Tanmuangpak & Dumrongrojwattana, 2022
- Hypselostoma depressispira van Benthem Jutting, 1949
- Hypselostoma diarmaidi Panha & J. B. Burch, 2003
- Hypselostoma dilatatum van Benthem Jutting, 1962
- Hypselostoma discobasis Vermeulen, Luu, Theary & Anker, 2019
- Hypselostoma edentatum Panha & J. B. Burch, 1999
- Hypselostoma edentulum Moellendorff, 1894
- Hypselostoma elephas van Benthem Jutting, 1950
- Hypselostoma emergens van Benthem Jutting, 1950
- Hypselostoma erawan Panha & J. B. Burch, 2003
- Hypselostoma erawan Panha & J. B. Burch, 2002
- Hypselostoma everetti (E. A. Smith, 1896)
- Hypselostoma fortunatum Gojšina, Hunyadi & Páll-Gergely, 2025
- Hypselostoma frequens (van Benthem Jutting, 1950)
- Hypselostoma fruhstorferi (Möllendorff, 1897)
- Hypselostoma fungus Gojšina, Hunyadi & Páll-Gergely, 2025
- Hypselostoma geckophilum Gojšina, Hunyadi & Páll-Gergely, 2025
- Hypselostoma holimanae F. G. Thompson & Lee, 1988
- Hypselostoma hungerfordianum (Möllendorff, 1891)
- Hypselostoma insularum Pilsbry, 1908
- Hypselostoma iunior Gojšina & Páll-Gergely, 2025
- Hypselostoma kelantanense (Sykes, 1902)
- Hypselostoma khaochakan Panha & J. B. Burch, 2003
- Hypselostoma khaochongpran Panha & J. B. Burch, 2002
- Hypselostoma khaochongensis Panha, 1997
- Hypselostoma khaowongense (Panha, 1997)
- Hypselostoma khaowongkot Panha & J. B. Burch, 2004
- Hypselostoma khmerianum (Sutcharit & Panha, 2023)
- Hypselostoma kohrin Panha & J. B. Burch, 2003
- Hypselostoma latispira F. G. Thompson & Auffenberg, 1984
- Hypselostoma lipaei Gojšina, Schilthuizen & Páll-Gergely, 2023
- Hypselostoma loei Panha & Prateespasen, 2005
- Hypselostoma luctans van Benthem Jutting, 1950
- Hypselostoma luzonicum Moellendorff, 1888
- Hypselostoma modestum van Benthem Jutting, 1950
- Hypselostoma muaklekense (Panha & J. B. Burch, 2002)
- Hypselostoma muangon Panha & J. B. Burch, 2004
- Hypselostoma muaklekense (Panha & J. B. Burch, 2002)
- Hypselostoma paini (F. G. Thompson & Dance, 1983)
- Hypselostoma panhai J. B. Burch & Tongkerd, 2002
- Hypselostoma pattalungense Panha & J. B. Burch, 2004
- Hypselostoma pendulum (Panha & J. B. Burch, 2002)
- Hypselostoma phoca Tongkerd & Panha, 2013
- Hypselostoma phupaman (Panha & J. B. Burch, 2002)
- Hypselostoma piconis van Benthem-Jutting, 1949
- Hypselostoma platybasis Gojšina, Hunyadi & Páll-Gergely, 2025
- Hypselostoma plesiolopa Inkhavilay & Panha, 2016
- Hypselostoma polyodon Moellendorff, 1896
- Hypselostoma pongrati Tanmuangpak & S. Tumpeesuwan, 2025
- Hypselostoma populare Gojšina, Hunyadi & Páll-Gergely, 2025
- Hypselostoma procerum (F. G. Thompson & Dance, 1983)
- Hypselostoma pusillum Moellendorff, 1894
- Hypselostoma quadrasi Moellendorff, 1896
- Hypselostoma roebeleni Moellendorff, 1894
- Hypselostoma rupestre van Benthem Jutting, 1962
- Hypselostoma salpinx van Benthem Jutting, 1961
- Hypselostoma saraburiensis Panha & J. B. Burch, 2003
- Hypselostoma saxicola van Benthem Jutting, 1960
- Hypselostoma sculpturatum Gojšina, Hunyadi & Páll-Gergely, 2025
- Hypselostoma serpa (van Benthem Jutting, 1950)
- Hypselostoma sibuyanicum Moellendorff, 1896
- Hypselostoma sichang (Panha & J. B. Burch, 2002)
- Hypselostoma sichomphuense Tanmuangpak & S. Tumpeesuwan, 2025
- Hypselostoma sigma Gojšina, Schilthuizen & Páll-Gergely, 2023
- Hypselostoma similare Gojšina, Hunyadi & Páll-Gergely, 2025
- Hypselostoma smokon Panha & J. B. Burch, 2004
- Hypselostoma sorormajor Gojšina, Hunyadi & Páll-Gergely, 2025
- Hypselostoma sororminor Gojšina, Hunyadi & Páll-Gergely, 2025
- Hypselostoma srakeoensis (Panha & J. B. Burch, 2004)
- Hypselostoma srirachaensis Panha & J. B. Burch, 2004
- Hypselostoma surakiti Panha & J. B. Burch, 2003
- Hypselostoma taehwani Panha & J. B. Burch, 2002
- Hypselostoma tarutao (Panha & J. B. Burch, 2002)
- Hypselostoma terae Tomlin, 1939
- Hypselostoma tertiusfrater Gojšina & Páll-Gergely, 2025
- Hypselostoma torta Gojšina, Auffenberg & Páll-Gergely, 2025
- Hypselostoma torticollis van Benthem Jutting, 1962
- Hypselostoma transitans (Möllendorff, 1894)
- Hypselostoma tridentatum Panha & J. B. Burch, 2004
- Hypselostoma troglodytes van Benthem Jutting, 1950
- Hypselostoma tubiferum Benson, 1856
- Hypselostoma utongensis Panha & J. B. Burch, 2004
- Hypselostoma venustum (van Benthem Jutting, 1950)
- Hypselostoma vesovici Gojšina & Páll-Gergely, 2025
- Hypselostoma vicinum Gojšina, Auffenberg & Páll-Gergely, 2025
- Hypselostoma vujici Gojšina & Páll-Gergely, 2025

== Synonyms ==
- Hypselostoma dayanum Stoliczka, 1871: synonym of Acinolaemus dayanum (Stoliczka, 1871) (superseded combination)
- Hypselostoma banmiensis Panha & J. B. Burch, 2004: synonym of Anauchen banmiensis Panha & J. B. Burch, 2004 (superseded combination)
- Hypselostoma dohertyi Fulton, 1899: synonym of Hypselostoma everetti E. A. Smith, 1896 (junior subjective synonym)
- Hypselostoma kentingensis C.-C. Hwang, 2014: synonym of Hypselostoma insularum Pilsbry, 1908 (junior subjective synonym)
- Hypselostoma lacrima Páll-Gergely & Hunyadi, 2015: synonym of Clostophis lacrima (Páll-Gergely & Hunyadi, 2015) (> superseded combination)
- Hypselostoma neglecta van Benthem-Jutting, 1961: synonym of Clostophis neglectus (van Benthem Jutting, 1961)
- Hypselostoma rochebruni Mabille, 1887: synonym of Anauchen rochebruni (Mabille, 1887) (superseded combination)
- Hypselostoma satulensis Panha & J. B. Burch, 2004: synonym of Hypselostoma hungerfordianum Möllendorff, 1891 (superseded combination)
- Hypselostoma socialis Páll-Gergely & Hunyadi, 2015: synonym of Clostophis socialis (Páll-Gergely & Hunyadi, 2015) (superseded combination, original combination)
- Hypselostoma striolatum (Möllendorff, 1895): synonym of Hypselostoma hungerfordianum Möllendorff, 1891 (junior subjective synonym)
