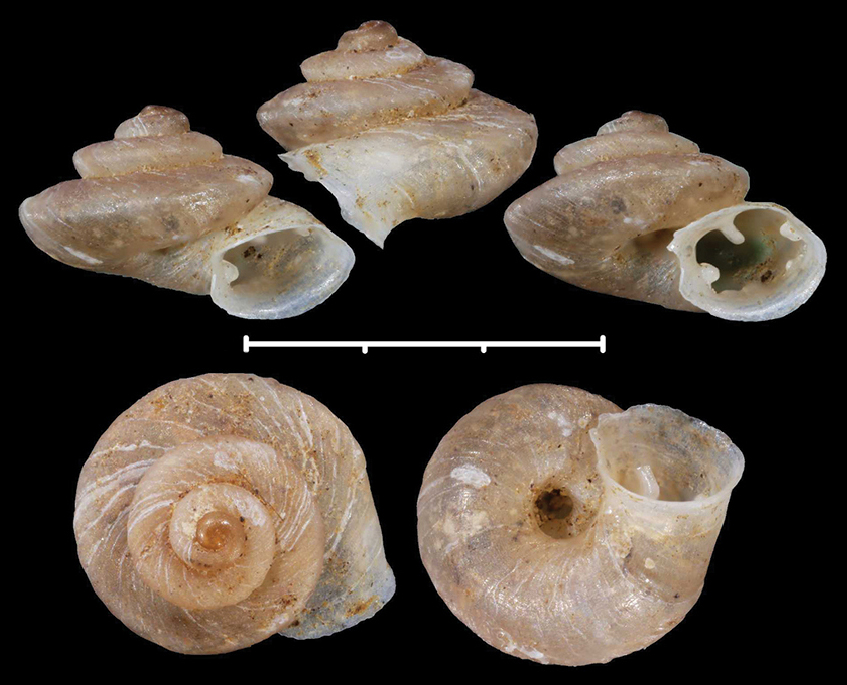
- Shell of Aulacospira scalatella

Scientific classification
- Kingdom: Animalia
- Phylum: Mollusca
- Class: Gastropoda
- Order: Stylommatophora
- Family: Hypselostomatidae
- Genus: Aulacospira
- Species: A. scalatella

Binomial name
- Aulacospira scalatella (Möllendorff, 1888)

Synonyms
- Helix scalatella Möllendorff, 1888 (original combination)

= Aulacospira scalatella =

Species of gastropod

Aulacospira scalatella is a species of small land snail with an operculum, terrestrial pulmonate gastropod mollusc in the family Cyclophoridae.

== Description ==
The height of the shell varies between 1.6 mm and 1.8 mm, its diameter between 2.7 mm and 2.8 mm.

(Original description) The shell is somewhat openly umbilicated, depressed, and thin in substance. It is finely and obliquely striated and possesses a brownish-horn color.

There are four whorls that are flat on their upper surface and obtusely angular at the periphery. These whorls are slightly detached from one another, which creates a spire with a depressed, scalariform (staircase-like) appearance. The body whorl is more convex at the base; it is deflected toward the front and becomes briefly detached from the preceding whorl just before the opening.

The aperture is diagonal and shaped like a rounded rhombus. It is narrowed by four teeth: one longer tooth is located on the parietal wall, another short one is on the outer margin, and the remaining basal and columellar teeth are merged (confluent) together.

(Description in 2019) The shell is flattened and keeled, characterized by a penultimate whorl that is distinctly elevated above the body whorl, creating a unique step-like appearance. On the dorsal side, the body whorl features a slight subsutural furrow. The protoconch is marked by spiral striations near the transition to the teleoconch, which itself is textured with rough wrinkles and fine spiral striae.

The aperture is detached and sits entirely free from the penultimate whorl. It is equipped with four primary denticles: two palatal, one parietal, and one columellar. In some specimens, a fifth, weaker basal tooth may also be present.

== Distribution ==
This species occurs in Luzon Island, the Philippines on limestome rocks.
