= Boysidia megaphonum =

Conservation status
- Vulnerable (IUCN 3.1)

Scientific classification
- Kingdom: Animalia
- Phylum: Mollusca
- Class: Gastropoda
- Order: Stylommatophora
- Family: Gastrocoptidae
- Genus: Boysidia
- Species: B. megaphonum

Binomial name
- Boysidia megaphonum van Benthem-Jutting, 1950

Synonyms
- Hypselostoma megaphonum (van Benthem Jutting, 1950)

Species of gastropod

Boysidia megaphonum is a species of terrestrial pulmonate gastropod in the family Gastrocoptidae.

The distribution of Boysidia megaphonum is restricted to a narrow region (0.25 km^{2}) of karstic moist-forest near Bukit Charas, Pahang, in Peninsular Malaysia.
