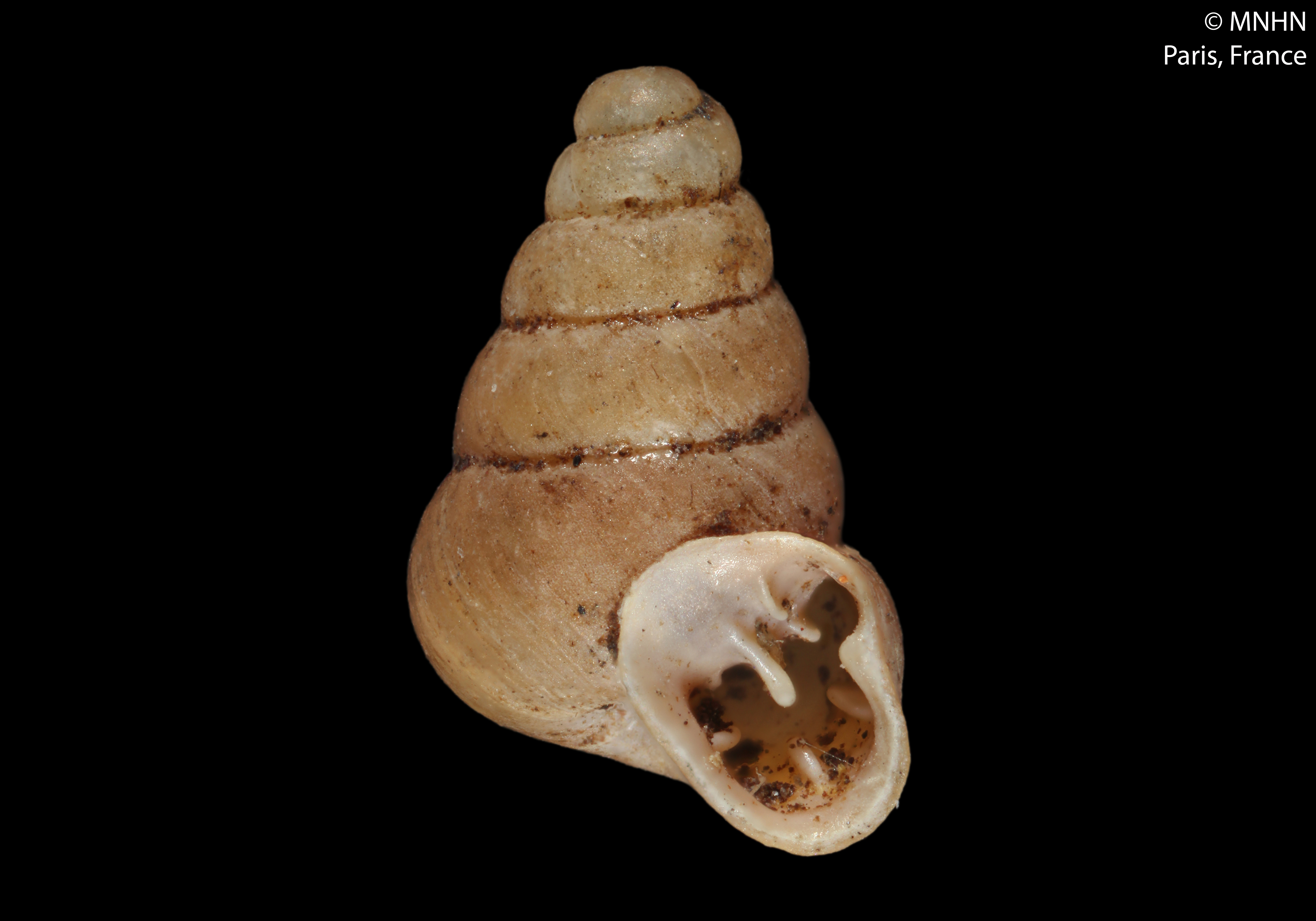
- Shell of Boysidia novemdentata (syntype at MNHN, Paris)

Scientific classification
- Kingdom: Animalia
- Phylum: Mollusca
- Class: Gastropoda
- Order: Stylommatophora
- Infraorder: Pupilloidei
- Superfamily: Pupilloidea
- Family: Hypselostomatidae
- Genus: Boysidia; Ancey, 1881

Type species
- Pupa dorsata Ancey, 1881

Synonyms
- Boysidia (Boysidia) Ancey, 1881 alternative representation; Hypselostoma (Boysidia) Ancey, 1881; Pupa (Boysidia) Ancey, 1881 (original rank); Pupa (Gredleriella) Möllendorff, 1884 junior subjective synonym

= Boysidia =

Genus of gastropods

Boysidia is a genus of air-breathing land snails in the family Hypselostomatidae.

Subgenera

- Boysidia (Boysidia) Ancey, 1881 accepted, alternate representation
- Boysidia (Dasypupa) F. G. Thompson & Dance, 1983 accepted, alternate representation

== Species ==
- Boysidia chiangmaiensis Panha & J. B. Burch, 1999
- Boysidia conspicua (Möllendorff, 1885)
- Boysidia dilamellaris D.-N. Chen, Y.-H. Liu & W.-X. Wu, 1995
- Boysidia dorsata (Ancey, 1881)
- Boysidia elephas (van Benthem Jutting, 1950)
- Boysidia fengxianensis D.-N. Chen, Y.-H. Liu & W.-X. Wu, 1995
- Boysidia gongyaoshanensis H.-F. Yang, W.-H. Zhang & D.-N. Chen, 2012
- Boysidia gracilis Haas, 1937
- Boysidia hangchowensis (Pilsbry & Y. Hirase, 1908)
- Boysidia huangguoshuensis T.-C. Luo, D.-N. Chen & G.-Q. Zhang, 2000
- Boysidia hunana (Gredler, 1881)
- Boysidia hupeana (Gredler, 1901)
- Boysidia lamothei Bavay & Dautzenberg, 1912
- Boysidia megaphonum (van Benthem Jutting, 1950)
- Boysidia novemdentata Saurin, 1953
- Boysidia orientalis B. Rensch, 1935
- Boysidia pahpetensis Saurin, 1953
- Boysidia paini F. G. Thompson & Dance, 1983
- Boysidia paviei Bavay & Dautzenberg, 1912
- Boysidia pentadens D.-N. Chen, M. Wu & G.-Q. Zhang, 1999
- Boysidia perigyra (van Benthem Jutting, 1950)
- Boysidia phatangensis Dumrongrojwattana & Assawawattagee, 2018
- Boysidia procera F. G. Thompson & Dance, 1983
- Boysidia ringens van Benthem Jutting, 1950
- Boysidia robusta Bavay & Dautzenberg, 1912
- Boysidia salpinx F. G. Thompson & Dance, 1983
- Boysidia strophostoma (Möllendorff, 1885)
- Boysidia taibaiensis D.-N. Chen, M. Wu & G.-Q. Zhang, 1999
- Boysidia tamtouriana Pokryszko & Auffenberg, 2009
- Boysidia terae (Tomlin, 1939)
- Boysidia tholus Panha, 2002
- Boysidia xianfengensis W.-H. Zhang, D.-N. Chen & W.-C. Zhou, 2014
- Boysidia xiaoguanensis W.-H. Zhang, D.-N. Chen & W.-C. Zhou, 2014
- Boysidia xishanensis D.-N. Chen, M. Wu & G.-Q. Zhang, 1999
