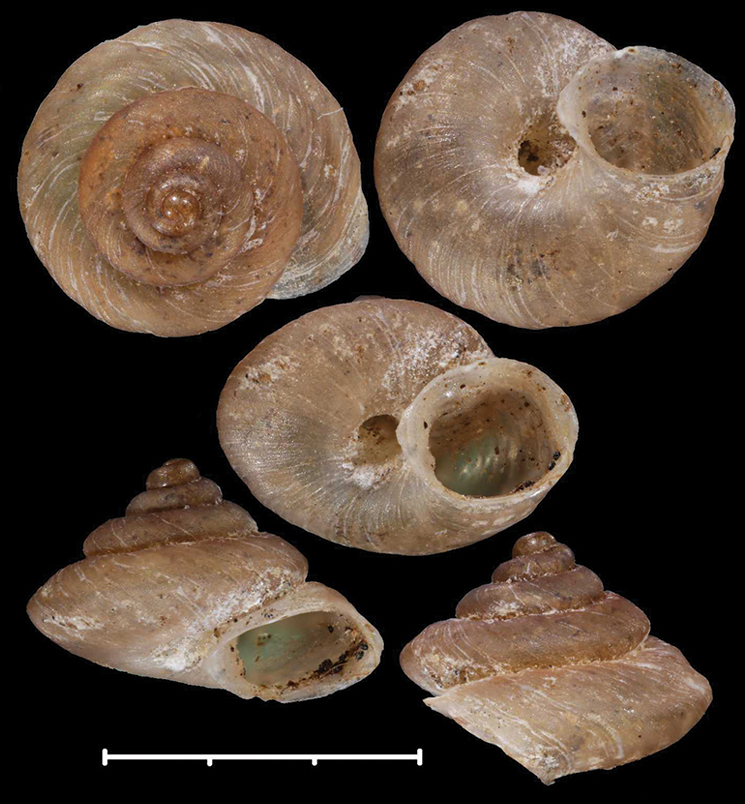
- Shell of Aulacospira hololoma

Scientific classification
- Kingdom: Animalia
- Phylum: Mollusca
- Class: Gastropoda
- Order: Stylommatophora
- Family: Hypselostomatidae
- Genus: Aulacospira
- Species: A. hololoma

Binomial name
- Aulacospira hololoma (Möllendorff, 1887)

Synonyms
- Aulacospira (Micropetasus) hololoma (Möllendorff, 1887) · alternative representation; Helix hololoma Möllendorff, 1887 (original combination)

= Aulacospira hololoma =

Species of gastropod

Aulacospira hololoma is a species of small land snail with an operculum, terrestrial pulmonate gastropod mollusc in the family Cyclophoridae.

== Description ==
The height of the shell attains 3 mm, its diameter 2.5 mm.

(Original description in Latin) The shell is narrowly umbilicated, trochiform (top-shaped), and carinated (keeled). On its upper surface, it is sculpted with minute, strongly oblique riblets, while the base is nearly smooth and colored a brownish-horn tint. The spire is conoid, terminating in a mamillary apex that is somewhat obtuse and smooth.

There are five convex whorls; the body whorl is subacutely keeled and features a deep groove above the keel. The base is slightly convex and turns downward (deflexed) at the front.

The aperture is extremely oblique and angularly elliptical in shape. The peristome is thin, continuous, and detached from the preceding whorl; it is expanded throughout but not reflected. Finally, the columella is thickened and is usually adorned with a tooth-like nodule.

== Distribution ==
It is endemic to Cebu island, the Philippines, occurring on limestone rocks.
