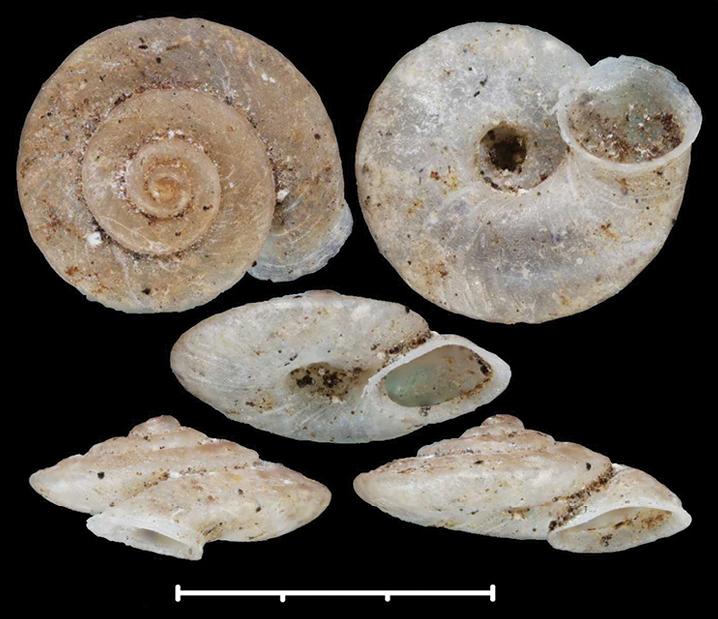
- Shell of Aulacospira mucronata

Scientific classification
- Kingdom: Animalia
- Phylum: Mollusca
- Class: Gastropoda
- Order: Stylommatophora
- Family: Hypselostomatidae
- Genus: Aulacospira
- Species: A. mucronata

Binomial name
- Aulacospira mucronata (Möllendorff, 1887)

Synonyms
- Aulacospira (Aulacospira) mucronata Zilch, 1984; Aulacospira (Micropetasus) mucronata (Möllendorff, 1887) · alternative representation; Helix mucronata Möllendorff, 1887 (original combination)

= Aulacospira mucronata =

Species of gastropod

Aulacospira mucronata is a species of small land snail with an operculum, terrestrial pulmonate gastropod mollusc in the family Cyclophoridae.

== Description ==
The height of the shell attains 1 mm, its diameter 3 mm.

(Original description in Latin) The shell is perspectively umbilicated (this indicates a wide, funnel-shaped hollow at the base that allows you to see the internal coils of the whorls all the way to the top), strongly depressed, and discoid in shape. On its upper surface, it is sculpted with very minute, oblique, and somewhat distant riblets; however, the base is only finely striated and nearly smooth. The entire shell is a pale horn color. The spire is only very slightly elevated, ending in a mamillary apex that is somewhat prominent.

There are four slightly convex whorls, which are separated by a deep suture and are hollowed out by a sufficiently deep spiral groove. The body whorl is angular at the periphery, flattened at the base, and turns downward briefly at the aperture.

The aperture is extremely oblique and angularly elliptical in shape. The peristome is thin, continuous, and detached (a key identifying feature); it is expanded on all sides but is not reflected.

== Distribution ==
It is endemic to Licos and Uling islands, the Philippines, occurring on limestone rocks.
