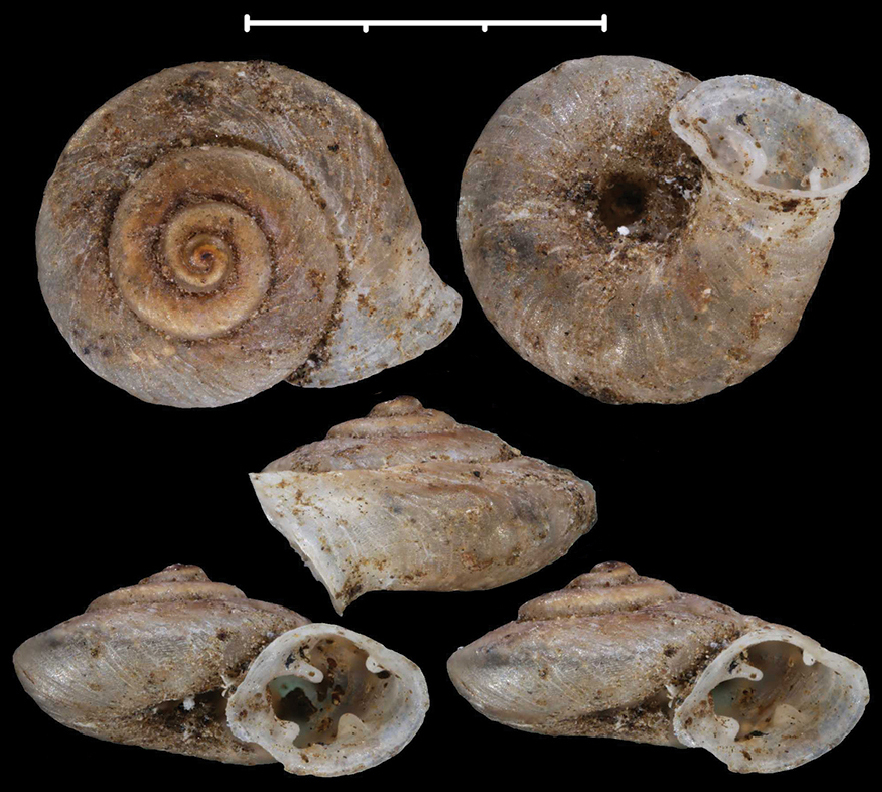
- Shell of Aulacospira rhombostoma

Scientific classification
- Kingdom: Animalia
- Phylum: Mollusca
- Class: Gastropoda
- Order: Stylommatophora
- Family: Hypselostomatidae
- Genus: Aulacospira
- Species: A. rhombostoma

Binomial name
- Aulacospira rhombostoma Quadras & Möllendorff, 1896

= Aulacospira rhombostoma =

Species of gastropod

Aulacospira rhombostoma is a species of small land snail with an operculum, terrestrial pulmonate gastropod mollusc in the family Cyclophoridae.

== Description ==
The height of the shell varies between 1.7 mm and 1.8 mm, its diameter between 3.2 mm and 3.5 mm.

(Original description) The shell is moderately but openly umbilicated, possessing a depressed-conoid shape. It is thin, finely striated, and opaque, with a yellowish-horn color. The spire is moderately elevated and somewhat stepped, terminating in an oblique, slightly pointed apex.

There are four whorls that are almost entirely flat and obtusely angular. The body whorl is lightly grooved on its upper surface just behind the angle; at the front, it descends briefly and becomes very slightly detached from the rest of the shell.

The aperture is strongly oblique and shaped like a rounded rhombus. The peristome is continuous and thin, with a slight expansion on all sides. Internally, the parietal lamella is strong and significantly elevated. This is accompanied by three teeth located on the columella, the base, and the outer margin; these are positioned opposite one another in the shape of a cross (this is a highly specific diagnostic trait).

(Description in 2019) The shell is strongly flattened and keeled, featuring a body whorl with a distinct subsutural furrow on its dorsal surface. The protoconch is smooth, while the teleoconch is characterized by a rugged texture of rough wrinkles overlaid with fine spiral striations.

The aperture is entirely free from the penultimate whorl (meaning the shell exhibits a solute aperture). Internally, it is equipped with a weak columellar tooth and a weak parietal tooth; additionally, it features a palatal ridge that corresponds to the external furrow (indicating that the indentation on the outside of the shell is so pronounced that it creates a structural rib or "lamella" on the inside of the aperture)

== Distribution ==
This species occurs in Tablas Island, the Philippines on limestome rocks.
