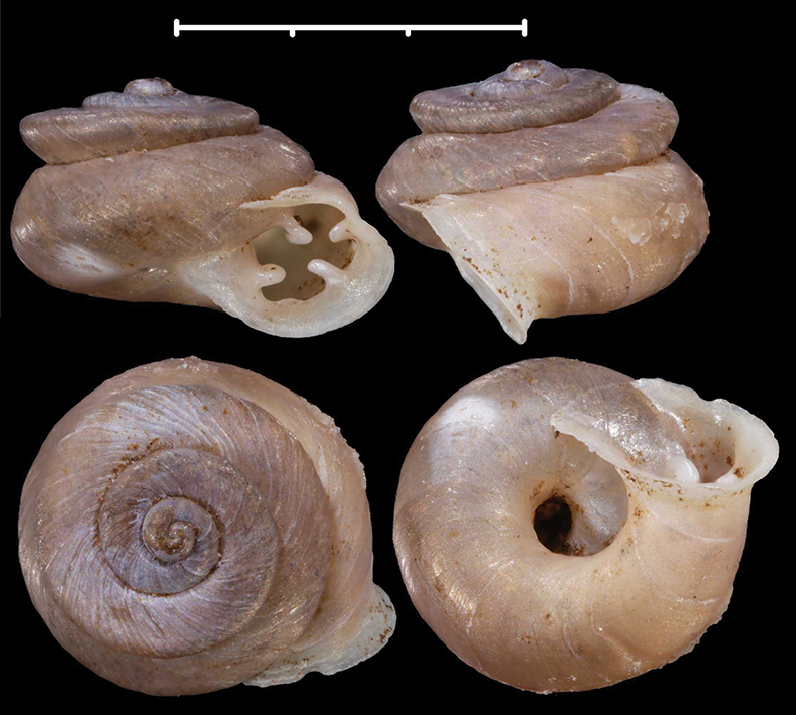
- Shell of Pseudostreptaxis azpeitiae

Scientific classification
- Kingdom: Animalia
- Phylum: Mollusca
- Class: Gastropoda
- Order: Stylommatophora
- Family: Hypselostomatidae
- Genus: Pseudostreptaxis
- Species: P. azpeitiae

Binomial name
- Pseudostreptaxis azpeitiae (Hidalgo, 1890)

Synonyms
- Aulacospira azpeitiae Hidalgo, 1890 superseded combination; Aulacospira (Pseudostreptaxis) azpeitiae Pilsbry, 1917; Helix (Aulacospira) azpeitiae Hidalgo, 1890 (original combination)

= Pseudostreptaxis azpeitiae =

Species of gastropod

Pseudostreptaxis azpeitiae is a species of small land snail with an operculum, terrestrial pulmonate gastropod mollusc in the family Cyclophoridae.

== Description ==
The diameter of the shell varies between 2.5 mm and 3 mm, its height attains 2 mm.

(Original description) The shell is openly umbilicated and possesses a convex-depressed shape. It is thin, scarcely striated, and lacks a shine; it is only slightly pellucid and has a brownish-horn color. The spire is irregular and takes a depressed, scalariform (staircase-like) shape, terminating in a relatively sharp apex. The suture is simple.

There are five whorls, which are flat on their upper surface. At the periphery, they are obtusely angular, with the angle projecting above the suture. The body whorl is convex at the base and either rounded or only slightly angular at the periphery. It is neither deflected at the front nor detached, though it is somewhat constricted behind the opening. Unlike several species in the family Hypselostomatidae that are solute (detached), this species is adnato, meaning the upper part of the aperture remains firmly fused to the body of the shell.

The aperture is nearly rounded and is narrowed by five fold-like teeth. The parietal tooth is longer and oblique, while the columellar tooth is transverse. The remaining teeth are located on the right margin, though the basal tooth is smaller and nodule-like, and is sometimes entirely absent.

The peristome is simple and expanded, with margins that are close together and joined by a very thin callus. The right margin is elongated and attached horizontally at the top, forming an extremely obtuse angle. Finally, the columellar margin is elongated and dilated at its point of insertion.

(Description in 2019) The shell is streptaxoid in form, defined by a penultimate whorl that is distinctly keeled and descends rapidly toward the aperture at an oblique angle to the shell axis. In contrast, the body whorl is more rounded and descends at a slower rate, giving the shell its characteristic "twisted" or asymmetrical appearance.

The protoconch is nearly smooth, featuring only very weak, barely visible spiral striations. The teleoconch, however, is more robustly textured with rough wrinkles and a degree of spiral striation.

The aperture is heavily armed with five teeth: a single parietal lamella, two palatal teeth, one columellar tooth, and one basal tooth, though the latter is occasionally absent in some specimens. The presence of up to five teeth suggests a high degree of specialization to protect the snail's soft body from small, probing predators

== Distribution ==
This species occurs in Busuanga Island, the Philippines on limestome rocks.
