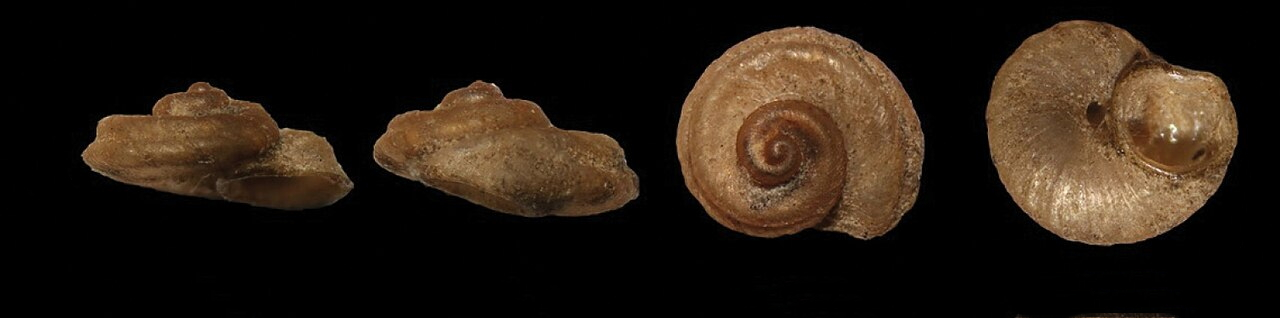
- Shell of Aulacospira depressa (paratype)

Scientific classification
- Kingdom: Animalia
- Phylum: Mollusca
- Class: Gastropoda
- Order: Stylommatophora
- Family: Hypselostomatidae
- Genus: Aulacospira
- Species: A. depressa

Binomial name
- Aulacospira depressa Dumrongrojwattana & Panha, 2006

Synonyms
- Aulacospira depressiana Dumrongrojwattana & Panha, 2006 (incorrect original spelling)

= Aulacospira depressa =

Species of gastropod

Aulacospira depressa is a species of small land snail with an operculum, terrestrial pulmonate gastropod mollusc in the family Cyclophoridae.

== Distribution ==
It is endemic to Thailand.

== Description ==
(original description) The height of the shell varies between 0.97 mm and 1.14 mm, its diameter between 2.51 mm and 3.15 mm.

The shell is minute and very depressed, featuring a very low spire and a brownish coloration. The protoconch is smooth, as is the teleoconch. The body whorl is large and characterized by a prominent groove that forms two distinct carinae (keels). The tuba is very short, and the peristome is expanded. Notably, the aperture lacks teeth entirely.

Radula and dentition: The central tooth of the radula is small, unicuspid, and triangular in shape. The lateral teeth are irregularly bicuspid; each consists of a large internal cusp situated adjacent to a smaller, shorter outer cusp. There are four lateral teeth on each side of the central tooth, with the first tooth being the largest and the subsequent teeth becoming sequentially smaller.The marginal teeth are also irregularly and unequally bicuspid, with the internal cusp being larger than the outer cusp. There are typically 7 or 8 marginal teeth on each side of the central tooth.

The radular formula is expressed as:7–8 : 4 : 1 : 4 : 7–8

== Distribution ==
This species occurs in Thailand on limestome rocks.
