= Barna Páll-Gergely =

Hungarian zoologist and malacologist

- Born: 20 May 1986 (age 40); Gheorgheni, Romania
- Education: Biology degree, University of Pécs (2011); PhD, Shinshu University, Matsumoto (2015)
- Known for: Research on terrestrial snails; discovery of Angustopila dominikae
- Awards: Tibor Jermy Prize (2020)
- Scientific career
- Fields: Zoology, malacology
- Website: ResearchGate

Barna Páll-Gergely (born 20 May 1986) is a Hungarian zoologist and malacologist who specializes in the taxonomy and biogeography of terrestrial snails. He is a member of the Hungarian Malacological Society.

Páll-Gergely graduated in biology from the University of Pécs in 2011, specializing in conservation biology. He received his PhD from Shinshu University in Matsumoto, Japan, in 2015.

His research focuses primarily on the taxonomy of terrestrial snails, particularly the families Plectopylidae, Clausiliidae, Enidae and Hygromiidae. His other research interests include faunistics, zoogeography of Hungary, Turkey, Romania and the Balkans, Quaternary and Holocene malacology, and the paleontology of molluscs.

Páll-Gergely has described and discovered several species of terrestrial snails. He discovered Angustopila dominikae, which has been described as the world's smallest known terrestrial snail. The species was named after his wife, Dominika.

In 2020, Páll-Gergely received the Tibor Jermy Prize, an award established by the Hungarian Academy of Sciences.
