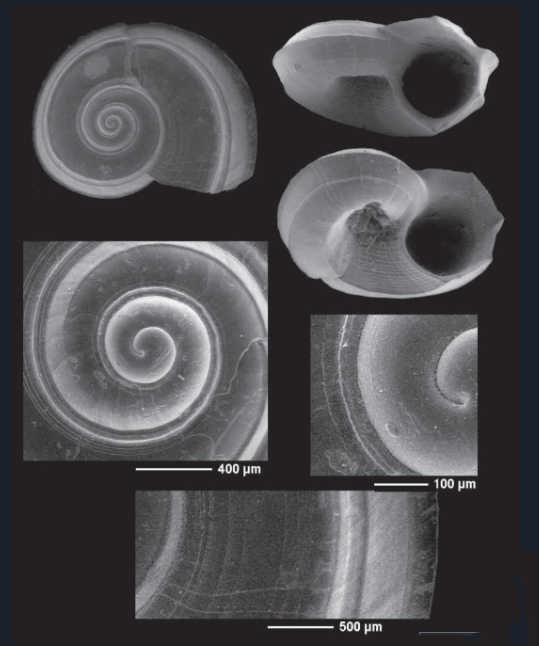
- Shell of Anauchen kozari

Scientific classification
- Kingdom: Animalia
- Phylum: Mollusca
- Class: Gastropoda
- Order: Stylommatophora
- Superfamily: Pupilloidea
- Family: Hypselostomatidae; Zilch, 1959

Synonyms
- Aulacospirinae Zilch, 1959 ·junior subjective synonym; Hypselostomatinae Zilch, 1959 superseded rank

= Hypselostomatidae =

Family of gastropods

Hypselostomatidae is a family of small, air-breathing land snails, terrestrial pulmonate gastropod molluscs in the superfamily Pupilloidea.

== General characteristics ==
The shell of a typical hypselostomatid ranges from conical or conical-ovoid to depressed-conical. However, the body whorl frequently becomes detached from the penultimate whorl (Hoekstra and Schilthuizen 2011; Chen et al. 2022). This separation—known as a solute or uncoiled condition—drastically alters the overall shell profile, often resulting in a trumpet-like or distorted appearance.

== Distribution ==
Distributed mainly in Southeastern Asia, but also in India to Pakistan, China, Japan and Australia; mostly on limestone habitats.

== Taxonomy ==
The Hypselostomatidae were originally established as a subfamily of Chondrinidae (Zilch 1959). In that same work, Zilch erected the subfamily Aulacospirinae, which was later synonymized by Schileyko (1998). Systematic placement has since remained a subject of debate: while Bouchet et al. (2017) treated the group as a subfamily of Gastrocoptidae, other authors have classified these representatives under Vertiginidae (Panha 1998; Tanmuangpak and Dumrongrojwattana 2022) or Pupillidae (Burch and Panha 2002). More recently, several authors have advocated for full family status as the Hypselostomatidae (Gojšina et al. 2022; Páll-Gergely 2023a, b).

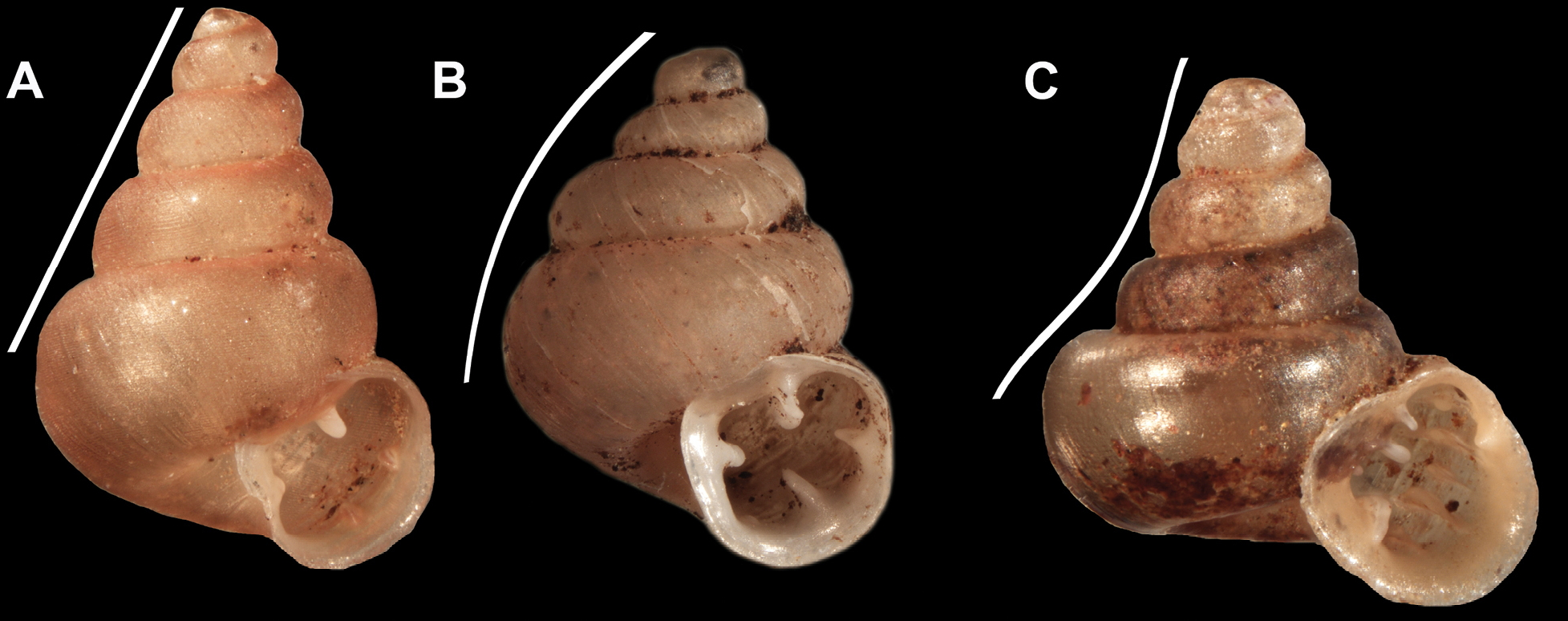
Shell shape variability of hypselostomatid genera (not to scale): A conical, B conical-ovoid, C concave-conical.

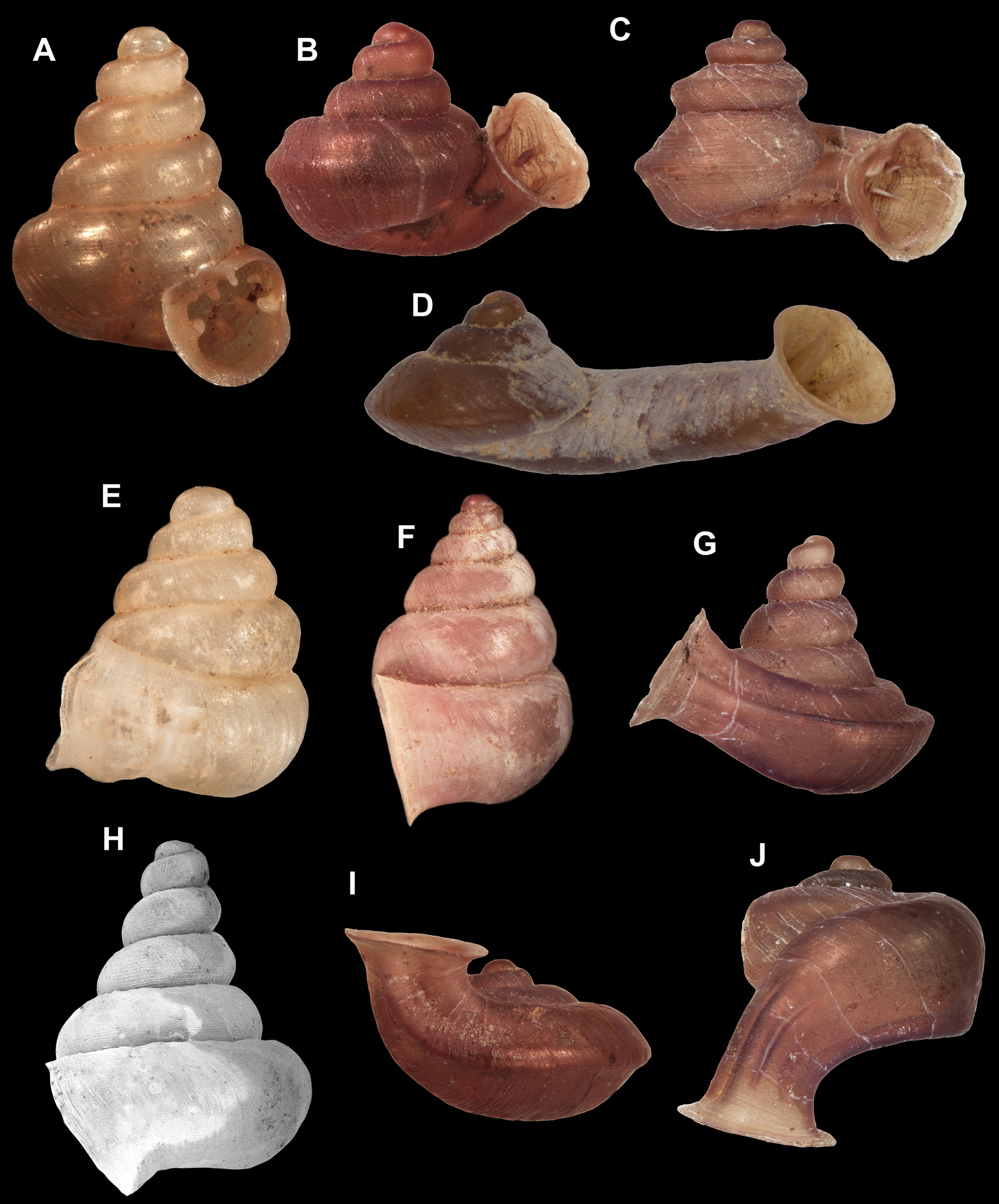
A–D detachment of the body whorl, E–J direction of the body whorl, A body whorl adnate to the penultimate, B body whorl slightly detached, C body whorl moderately detached, D body whorl strongly detached; E body whorl slightly ascending, F body whorl slightly descending, G body whorl moderately ascending, H body whorl moderately descending, I body whorl strongly ascending, J body whorl strongly descending

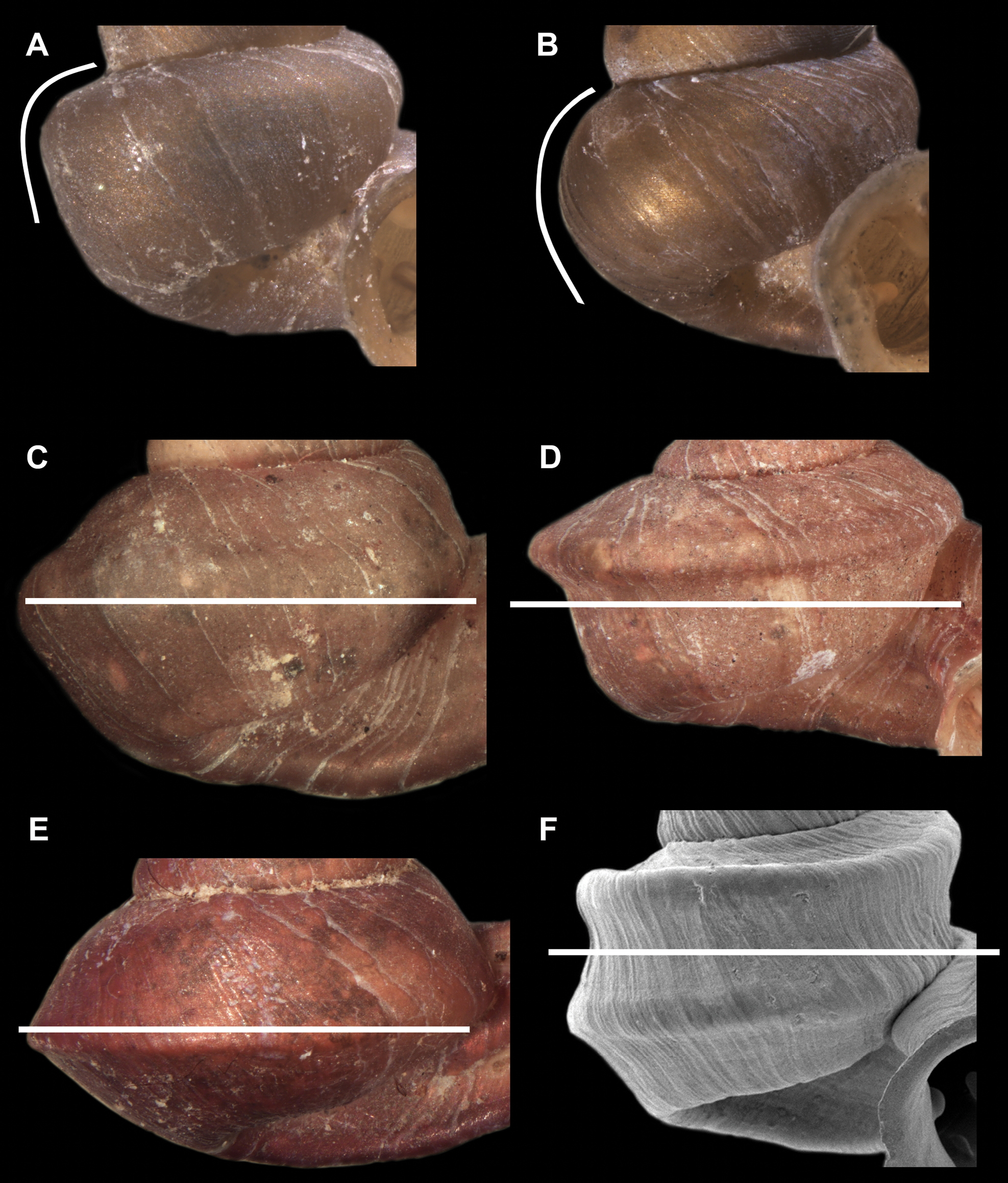
Appearance of the body whorl: A shouldered, B rounded, C keeled at the centre of the periphery, D keeled above the centre of the periphery, E keeled below the centre of the periphery, F double keeled.

== Genera ==
- Acinolaemus Thompson & Upatham, 1997
- Anauchen Pilsbry, 1917
- Angustopila Jochum, Slapnik & Páll-Gergely, 2014
- Antroapiculus Panha & Burch, 1999: synonym of Antroapiculus Panha & J. B. Burch, 2002 accepted as Hypselostoma W. H. Benson, 1856 (incorrect subsequent spelling)
- Aulacospira Möllendorff, 1890
- Bensonella Pilsbry & Vanatta, 1900
- Boysia L. Pfeiffer, 1849
- Boysidia Ancey, 1881
- Clostophis Benson, 1860
- Dentisphaera Páll-Gergely & Jochum, 2017 - endemic to the caves in Northern Vietnam
- Gyliotrachela Tomlin, 1930: synonym of Hypselostoma W. H. Benson, 1856 (junior subjective synonym)
- Hypselostoma Benson, 1856 - the type genus of the family
- Krobylos Panha & Burch, 1999
- Montapiculus Panha & Burch, 1999: synonym of Clostophis W. H. Benson, 1860 (junior synonym)
- Pseudostreptaxis Möllendorff, 1890
- Tonkinospira Jochum, Slapnik & Páll-Gergely, 2014
- Paraboysidia Pilsbry, 1917: synonym of Bensonella Pilsbry & Vanatta, 1900 (junior subjective synonym)
