= List of non-marine molluscs of India =

Location of India

The non-marine molluscs of India are a part of the molluscan fauna of India.

There are 5070 species of marine and non-marine molluscs living in the wild in India. There are 3371 species of marine molluscs in India.

There are a total of 1671 species of non-marine molluscs living in the wild in India. This includes 1488 terrestrial species in 140 genera and 183 freshwater species in 53 genera.

There are a total of ?? species of gastropods, which breaks down into 183 species of freshwater gastropods across 53 genera and 1488 species of land gastropods, plus ?? species of bivalves living in the wild.

Summary table of number of species

	India
freshwater gastropods	??
land gastropods	1488 (??? species of snails and ??? species of slugs)
gastropods altogether	???
bivalves	??
non-marine molluscs altogether	1671
non-indigenous gastropods in the wild	? freshwater and ? land
non-indigenous synanthropic gastropods	?
non-indigenous bivalves in the wild	?
non-indigenous synanthropic bivalves	?
non-indigenous molluscs altogether	?

== Freshwater gastropods ==
Neritidae

- Neripteron auriculatum (Lamarck, 1816)
- Neripteron violaceum (Gmelin, 1791)
- Neritina pulligera (Linnaeus, 1767)
- Neritina platyconcha (Annandale & Prashad, 1919) – subgenus Dostia
- Neritina perottetiana (Recluz) – subgenus Vittina
- Neritina smithi (Wood, 1828) – subgenus Vittina
- Neritina turrita (Gmelin, 1791)
- Neritina variegata Lesson – subgenus Vittina
- Neritodryas subsulcata (G. B. Sowerby I, 1836)
- Theodoxus bicolor (Récluz, 1843) – subgenus Clithon
- Theodoxus corona (Linnaeus, 1758) – subgenus Clithon
- Theodoxus reticularis Sowerby, 1838 – subgenus Clithon
- Septaria lineata (Lamarck, 1816)
- Septaria porcellana (Linnaeus, 1758)

Viviparidae

- Angulyagra microchaetophora (Annandale, 1921)
- Angulyagra oxytropis (Benson, 1836)
- Taia crassicallosa Annandale & Rao, 1925

Ampullariidae

- Pila globosa (Swainson, 1822) – including varieties incrassatula (Nevill) and minor (Nevill)
- Pila olea (Reeve, 1856)
- Pila conica (Gray, 1828) – including variety compacta Reeve
- Pila theobaldi Hanley, 1875
- Pila virens (Lamarck, 1822)
- Pila saxea (Reeve, 1856)

Valvatidae

- Valvata piscinalis (O. F. Müller, 1774)

Littorinidae

- Cremnoconchus syhadrensis (Blanford, 1863)
- Cremnoconchus conicus Blanford, 1870 – synonym: Cremnoconchus carinatus (Layard, 1854)
- Mainwaringia paludomoidea (G. Nevill, 1885)

Pomatiopsidae

- Tricula montana (Benson, 1843)

Amnicolidae

- Erhaia nainatalensis Davis & Rao, 1997

Hydrobiidae

- Mysorella costigera (Küster, 1852)

Assimineidae

- Assiminea brevicula Pfeiffer, 1854

Thiaridae

- Paludomus tanschauria Gmelin
- Melanoides tuberculata (O. F. Müller, 1774)
- Plotia scabra (O. F. Müller, 1774)

Lymnaeidae

- Radix luteola (Lamarck, 1822)

Planorbidae

- Anisus convexiusulcus (Benson, 1863) = Gyraulus convexiusulcus (Benson, 1863)
- Indoplanorbis exustus (Deshayes, 1834)

== Land gastropods ==
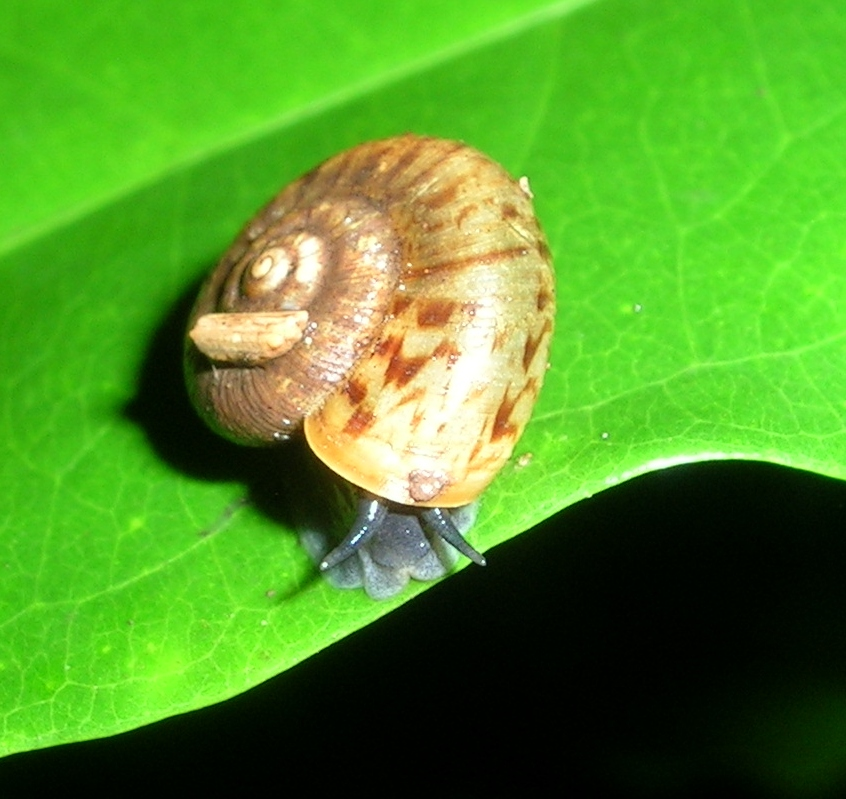
An unidentified snail from Nandi Hills, India.

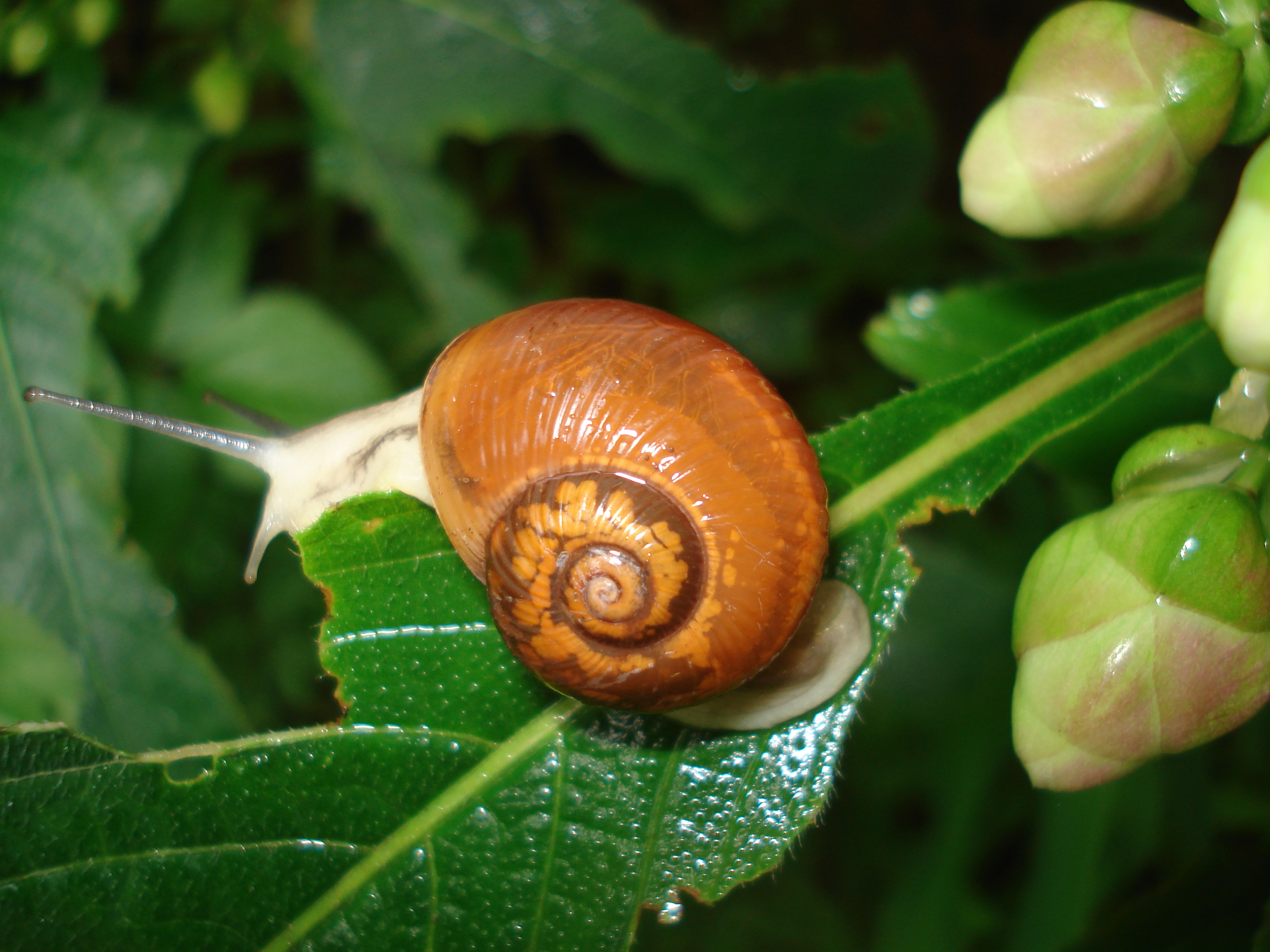
A sinistral snail from Torna Fort, Pune District, Maharashtra, India

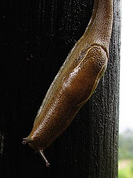
An unidentified gastropod from Kodachadri, southwestern India

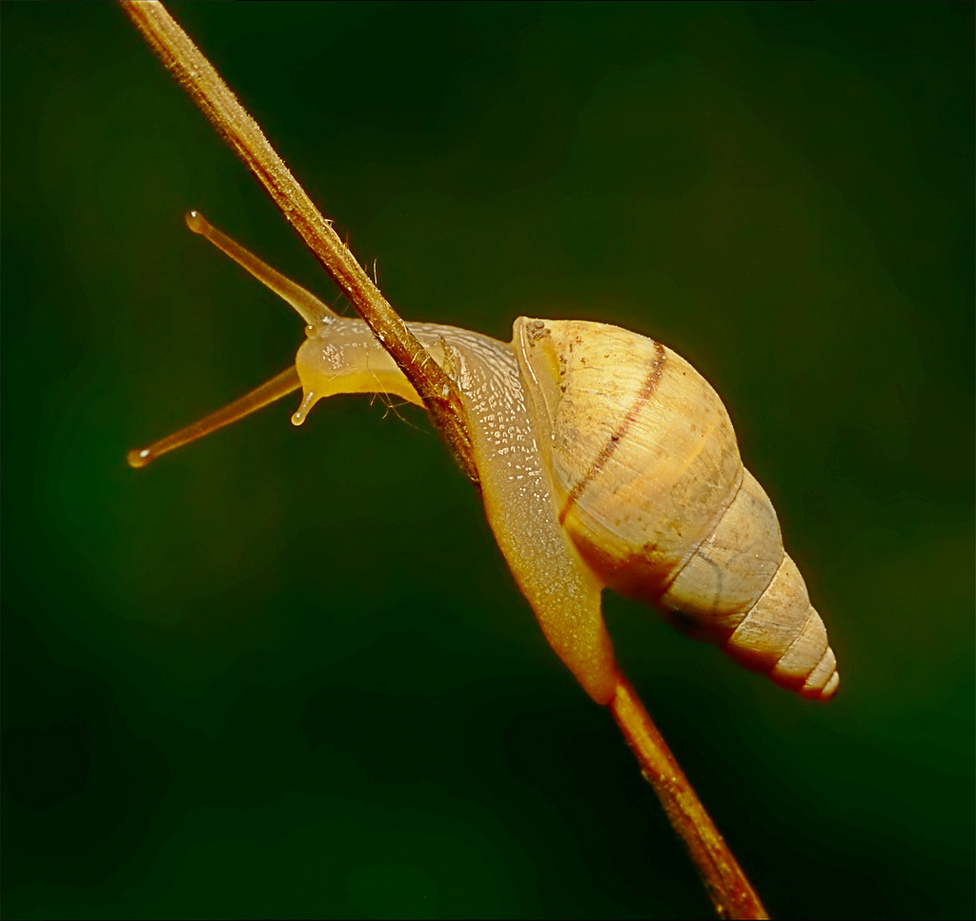
An unidentified gastropod from India

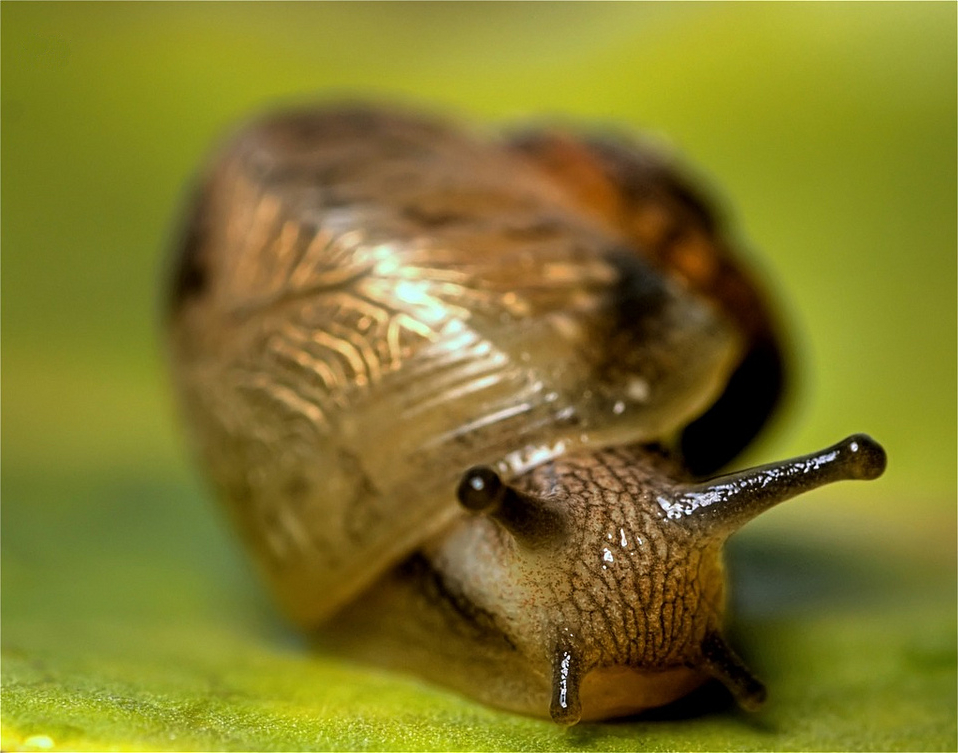
Closeup to an unidentified gastropod from India

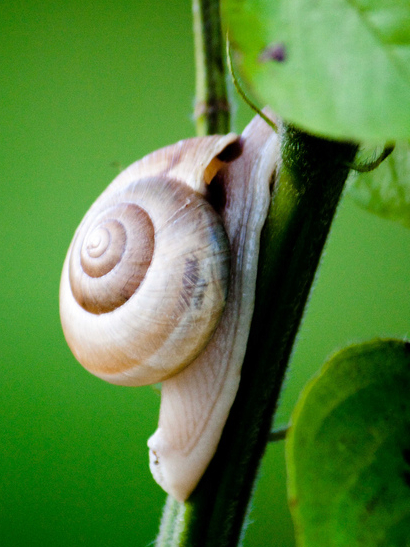
An unidentified gastropod from India. This snail has the caudal mucous pit on its tail end.

Species of gastropods of India include:

Assimineidae

- Acmella roepstorffiana Nevill, 1878
- Acmella tersa (Benson, 1853)

Hydrocenidae

- Georissa pyxis (Benson, 1856)

Helicinidae

- Pleuropoma andamanica (Benson, 1860)
- Pleuropoma arakanensis (W. T. Blanford, 1865)
- Pleuropoma dunkeri (Zelebor, 1867)
- Pleuropoma nicobarica (L. Pfeiffer, 1847)
- Pleuropoma rogersi (Bourne, 1911)
- Pleuropoma scrupula (Benson, 1863)
- Sulfurina behniana (Pfeiffer, 1865)
- Sulfurina bensoni A. J. Wagner, 1907
- Sulfurina zelebori (L. Pfeiffer, 1867)

Achatinidae

- Achatina fulica fulica (Bowdich, 1822)

Camaenidae

- Amphidromus
- Chloritis propinqua (Pfeiffer, 1857)

Cerastidae

- Rhachis bengalensis (Lamarck, 1822)
- Rhachis praetermissus (Blanford, 1861)
- Rhachis pulcher (Gray, 1825)
- Rhachis punctatus (Anton, 1839)

Charopidae

- Ruthvenia retifera (Pfeiffer, 1845)

Cyclophoridae

- Alycaeus expatriatus (Blanford, 1860)
- Alycaeus footei (Blanford, 1861)
- Craspedotropis bilirata (Beddome, 1875)
- Craspedotropis cuspidata (Benson, 1851)
- Cyathopoma atrosetosum (Beddome, 1875)
- Cyathopoma filocinctum (Benson, 1851)
- Cyathopoma latilabrie (Beddome, 1875)
- Cyathopoma nitidum (Beddome, 1875)
- Cyathopoma ovatum (Beddome, 1875)
- Cyathopoma trochlea (Benson, 1851)
- Cyathopoma wynaadense (Blanford, 1868)
- Cyclophorus altivagus (Benson, 1854)
- Cyclophorus bensoni (Pfeiffer, 1854)
- Cyclophorus cryptomphalus Benson, 1857
- Cyclophorus indicus (Deshayes, 1832)
- Cyclophorus malayanus (Benson, 1852)
- Cyclophorus nilagiricus (Benson, 1852)
- Cyclophorus siamensis (Sowerby, 1850)
- Cyclophorus stenomphalus (Pfeiffer, 1846)
- Cyclophorus volvulus (O.F. Müller, 1774)
- Cyclophorus zebrinus (Benson, 1836)
- Leptopomoides valvatus (Mollendroff, 1897)
- Mychopoma seticinctum (Beddome, 1875)
- Pterocyclus bilabiatus (Sowerby, 1843)
- Pterocyclus comatus (Mollendorff, 1897)
- Pterocyclus cyclophoroideus (G. Nevill, 1881)
- Pterocyclus nanus (Benson, 1851)
- Scabrina phenotopicus (Benson, 1851
- Scabrina pinnulifer (Benson, 1857)
- Theobaldius ravidus (Benson, 1851)
- Theobaldius stenostoma (G. B. Sowerby I, 1843)
- Theobaldius tristis (Blanford, 1869)

Pupinidae

- Tortulosa recurvatus (Pfeiffer, 1862)

Diplommatinidae

- Nicida anamullayana (Beddome, 1875)
- Nicida liricincta (Blanford, 1868)
- Nicida nilgirica (Blanford, 1860)
- Nicida nitidula (Blanford, 1868)
- Nicida subovata (Beddome, 1875)
- Opisthostoma deccanense (Beddome, 1875)
- Opisthostoma fairbanki (Blanford, 1866)
- Ophisthostoma macrostoma (Blanford, 1869)
- Diplommatina canarica (Beddome, 1875)

Endodontidae

- Philalanka bidenticulata (Benson, 1852)
- Philalanka daghoba (Blanford, 1861)
- Philalanka quinquilirata (Gude, 1914)
- Thysanota guerini (Pfeiffer, 1842)
- Ruthvenia retifera (Pfeiffer, 1845)

Enidae

- Ena

Staffordiidae – this family lives only in India

- Staffordia daflaensis (Godwin-Austen)
- Staffordia staffordi (Godwin-Austen)
- Staffordia toruputuensis Godwin-Austen

Helicarionidae

- Kaliella barrackporensis (Pfeiffer, 1852)
- Kaliella sigurensis (Godwin-Austen, 1882)
- Sitala liricincta (Stolickzka, 1871)
- Sitala palmaria (Benson, 1864)
- Sitala denselirata (Preston, 1908)

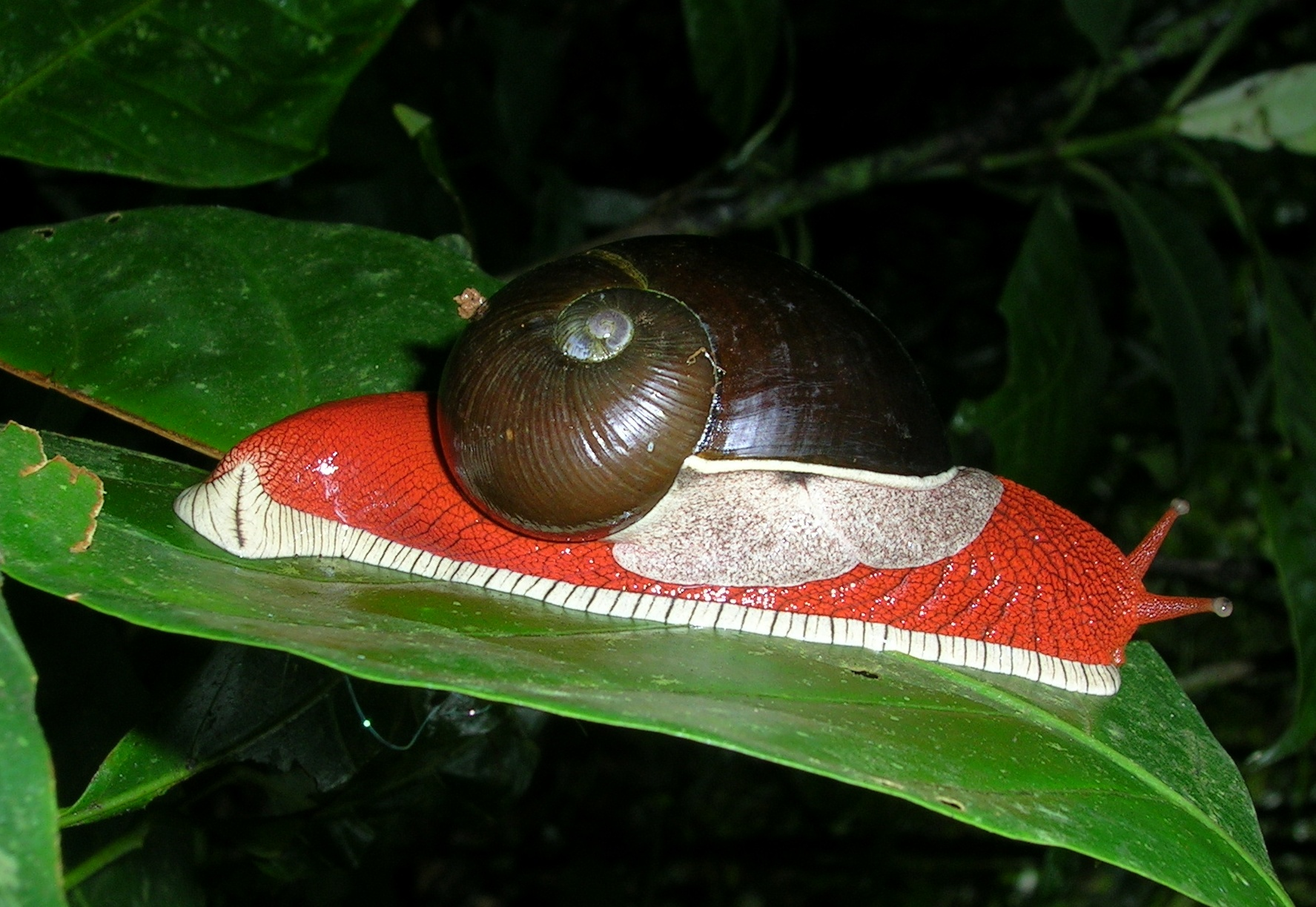
Indrella ampulla is a large tropical snail from the Western Ghats of India.

Ariophantidae

- Ariophanta canarica (Blanford, 1901)
- Ariophanta cysis (Benson, 1852)
- Ariophanta immerita (Blanford, 1870)
- Ariophanta interrupta (Benson, 1834)
- Ariophanta kadapaensis (Nevill, 1878)
- Ariophanta thyreus (Benson, 1852)
- Cryptozona albata (Blanford, 1880) (subgenus Xestina)
- Cryptozona belangeri (Deshayes, 1834) (subgenus Xestina)
- Cryptozona bistrialis (Beck) (subgenus Xestina)
- Cryptozona ligulata (Ferussac, 1821)
- Cryptozona maderaspatana (Gray, 1834) (subgenus Nilgiria)
- Cryptozona semirugata (Beck, 1837) (subgenus Nilgiria)
- Cryptozona sisparica (Blanford, 1866)
- Cryptozona solata (Benson, 1848)
- Euplecta acuducta (Benson, 1850)
- Euplecta cacuminifera (Benson, 1850)
- Euplecta fluctuosa (Blanford, 1901)
- Euplecta hyphasma (Pfeiffer, 1853)
- Euplecta granulifera (Blanford, 1901)
- Euplecta indica (Pfeiffer, 1846)
- Euplecta mucronifera (H. Adams, 1869)
- Euplecta semidecussata (Pfeiffer, 1851)
- Euplecta subdecussata (Pfeiffer, 1857)
- Euplecta travancorica (Benson, 1865)
- Hemiplecta beddomii (Blanford, 1874)
- Macrochlamys aulopsis (Benson, 1863)
- Macrochlamys indica Benson, 1832
- Macrochlamys lixa (Blanford, 1866)
- Macrochlamys prava (Blanford, 1904)
- Macrochlamys vilipensa (Benson, 1853)
- Macrochlamys woodiana (Pfeiffer, 1851)
- Indrella ampulla (Benson, 1850)

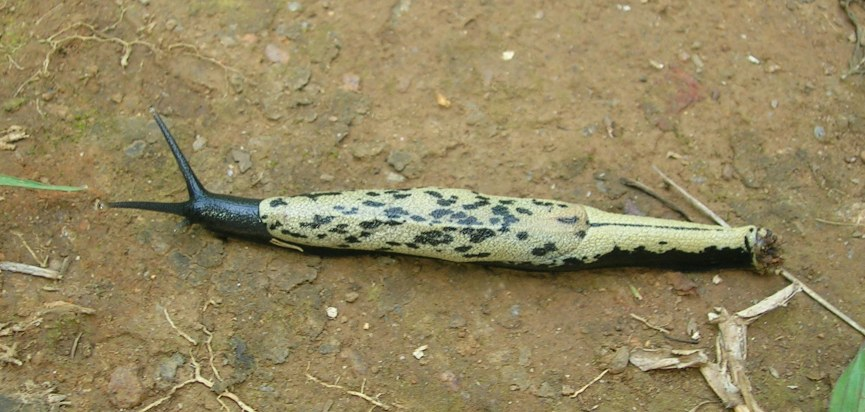
A slug from the Western Ghats of India. The species is tentatively identified as Mariaella dussumieri, family Ariophantidae

- Mariaella beddomei (Godwin-Austen, 1888)
- Mariaella dussumieri (Gray, 1855)

Pupillidae

- Pupilla

Pyramidulidae

- Pyramidula

Streptaxidae

- Streptaxis canaricus (Blanford, 1869)
- Streptaxis concinnus (Blanford, 1880)
- Streptaxis peroteti (Petit, 1841)
- Streptaxis scalptus (Blanford, 1899)
- Streptaxis subacutus (Blanford, 1899)
- Gluella canarica (Blanford, 1880)
- Gluella exilis (Blanford, 1880)
- Gluella turricula (Blanford, 1899)
- Huttonella bicolor (Hutton)
- Ennea
- Perrottetia rajeshgopali Bhosale, Thackeray & Rowson, 2021

Diapheridae

- Sinoennea Kobelt, 1904

Succineidae

- Succinea baconi (Pfeiffer, 1854)
- Succinea gravelyi Rao, 1924
- Succinea raoi (Subba Rao & Mitra, 1976)
- Succinea subgranosa (Pfeiffer, 1849)

Subulinidae

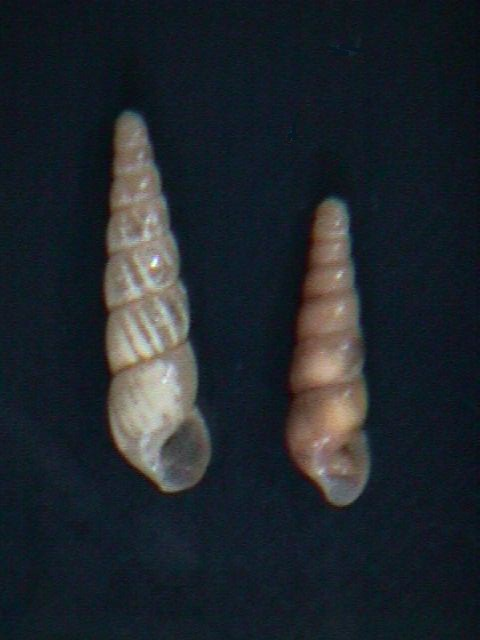
Subulina octona

- Opeas gracilis (Hutton, 1834)
- Subulina octona (Bruguière, 1789)
- Zootecus insularis (Ehrenberg, 1831)
- Glessula canarica (Beddome, 1906)
- Glessula chessoni (Benson, 1860)
- Glessula inornata (Pfeiffer, 1851)
- Glessula mullorum (Blanford, 1861)
- Glessula oreas (Reeve, 1850)
- Glessula orophila (Reeve, 1849)
- Glessula perrotteti (Pfeiffer, 1842)
- Glessula pseudoreas (Nevill, 1881)
- Glessula subserena (Beddome, 1906)
- Glessula tenuispira (Benson, 1836)
- Glessula textilis (Blanford, 1866)
- Glessula tornensis (Blanford, 1870)
- Lamellaxis gracile (Hutton, 1834)
- Zootecus chion (Pfeiffer, 1856)

Valloniidae

- Vallonia

Veronicellidae

- Vaginulus alte Férussac, 1821 =? Laevicaulis alte (Férussac, 1822)
- Filicaulis (Lavecaulis) frauenfeldi (Semper, 1885) = Vaginula frauenfeldi Semper, 1885

Vertiginidae

- Pupisoma evezardi (Blanford, 1875)

Pleurodontidae

- Planispira fallaciosa (Férussac, 1821)
- Planispira nilagerica (Pfeiffer, 1845)
- Planispira vittata (Muller, 1774)

unsorted:

- Lithotis rupicola
- Diplommantina
- Apatetes
- Corilla
- Edouardia
- Eurychlamys
- Microcystina
- Prosopeas
- Pupoides
- Bifidaria
- Micraulax
- Pearsonia
- Pseudaustenia
- Cyclotopsis
- Thysanota
- Planispira
- Rachisellus
- Satiella
- Cerastus

== See also ==
- List of marine molluscs of India
- List of non-marine molluscs of Pakistan
- List of non-marine molluscs of China
- List of non-marine molluscs of Nepal
- List of non-marine molluscs of Bhutan
- List of non-marine molluscs of Bangladesh
- List of non-marine molluscs of Myanmar
- List of non-marine molluscs of Sri Lanka
- List of non-marine molluscs of Maldives
- List of non-marine molluscs of Indonesia
