= List of non-marine molluscs of Bhutan =

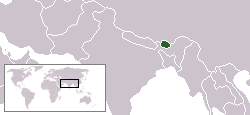
Location of Bhutan

The non-marine mollusks of Bhutan are a part of the molluscan fauna of Bhutan (wildlife of Bhutan). A number of species of non-marine mollusks are found in the wild in Bhutan.

== Freshwater gastropods ==
Amnicolidae

- Erhaia jannei Gittenberger & Stelbrink, 2020
- Erhaia norbui Gittenberger, Gyeltshen & Stelbrink, 2022
- Erhaia pelkiae Gittenberger & Gyeltshen, 2020
- Erhaia wangchuki Gittenberger, Sherub & Stelbrink, 2017

Pomatiopsidae

- Tricula montana (Benson, 1843)

Viviparidae

- Bellamya bengalensis (Lamarck, 1822)

Pachychilidae

- Brotia costula (Rafinesque, 1833)

Paludomidae

- Paludomus conica (Gray, 1833)

Thiaridae

- Melanoides tuberculata (Müller, 1774)
- Thiara granifera (Lamarck, 1822)
- Thiara lineata (Gray, 1828)
- Thiara scabra (Müller, 1774)

Lymnaeidae

- Galba truncatula (Müller, 1774)
- Radix acuminata (Lamarck, 1822)
- Radix andersoniana (Nevill, 1881)

Planorbidae

- Gyraulus rotula (Benson, 1850)
- Gyraulus sivalensis (Clessin, 1884)

== Land gastropods ==
Helicarionidae

- Rahula kleini Gittenberger, Leda & Sherub, 2017
- Rahula trongsaensis Gittenberger, Leda & Sherub, 2017

Pupinidae

- Pseudopomatias barnai Gittenberger, Leda, Sherub & Gyeltshen, 2019
- Pseudopomatias prestoni Páll-Gergely, 2015
- Schistoloma funiculalum (Benson, 1838)
- Streptaulus blanfordi Benson, 1857

Plectopylidae

- Endothyrella bhutanensis Gittenberger, Leda, Sherub & Páll-Gergely, 2018
- Endothyrella blanda (Gude, 1898)
- Endothyrella pemagatshel Gittenberger, Leda, Sherub & Páll-Gergely, 2018
- Endothyrella spirostriata Gittenberger, Leda, Sherub & Páll-Gergely, 2018

Clausiliidae

- Cylindrophaedusa parvula Gittenberger & Leda, 2019
- Cylindrophaedusa tenzini Gittenberger & Sherub, 2019
- Phaedusa adrianae Gittenberger & Leda, 2019
- Phaedusa bhutanensis Nordsieck, 1974
- Phaedusa chimiae Gittenberger & Sherub, 2019
- Phaedusa sangayae Gittenberger & Leda, 2019

Endodontidae

- Philalanka bhutana Gittenberger, Gyeltshen & Sherub, 2021

Euconulidae

- Sculpteuconulus obliquistriatus Gittenberger, Gyeltshen & Sherub, 2021

Agriolimacidae

- Deroceras laeve (O. F. Müller, 1774)

Vertiginidae

- Truncatellina bhutanensis Gittenberger, Leda & Sherub, 2013

Carychiidae

- Carychium indicum Benson, 1849

== See also ==
Lists of molluscs of surrounding countries:

- List of non-marine molluscs of China
- List of non-marine molluscs of India
