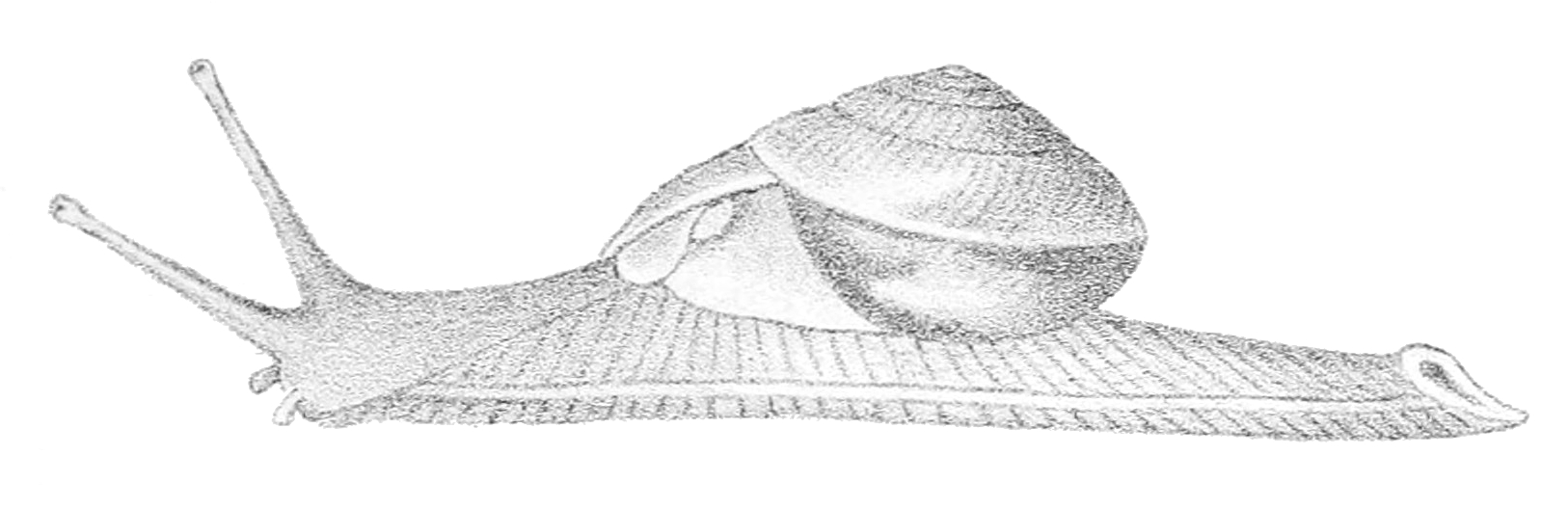
- A drawing of Ariophanta interrupta

Scientific classification
- Domain: Eukaryota
- Kingdom: Animalia
- Phylum: Mollusca
- Class: Gastropoda
- Order: Stylommatophora
- Family: Ariophantidae
- Genus: Ariophanta
- Species: A. interrupta

Binomial name
- Ariophanta interrupta Benson, 1834

Synonyms
- Helix himalayana Lea, 1831; Nanina himalayana

= Ariophanta interrupta =

Species of gastropod

Ariophanta interrupta is a species of air-breathing land snail, a terrestrial pulmonate gastropod mollusk in the family Ariophantidae.

The visible external soft parts of the animal are pinkish grey in color.

== Shell description ==
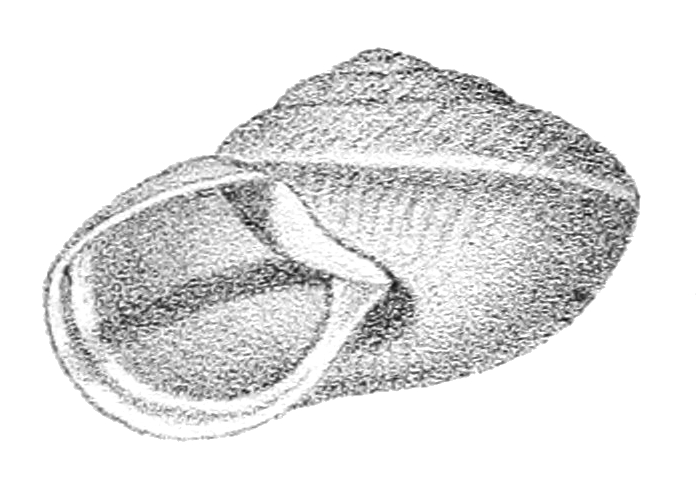
Drawing of the shell of Ariophanta interrupta.

The shell of this species is left-handed (sinistral).

The shell is not flatly convex above, rather coarsely, obliquely, plicately striated and decussated with fine impressed lines, the decussation is sometimes obsolete, more tumid and smoother beneath. The shell color is brownish horny, darker below the periphery, and gradually becoming paler again beneath. The shell has 4½-5 whorls, convex above, the last augulate at the periphery.

The aperture is roundly lunate. The peristome is thin.

The width of the shell is 22–32 mm. The height is 15-16-17 mm.

== Distribution ==
This species lives in India (Bengal, Behar, Orissa, Ganjam, Golconda Hills, Vizagapatam, Calcutta, Pareshnath), Himalayas and Ganges region.
