= Tricula =

Scientific classification
- Kingdom: Animalia
- Phylum: Mollusca
- Class: Gastropoda
- Subclass: Caenogastropoda
- Order: Littorinimorpha
- Family: Pomatiopsidae
- Genus: Tricula; Benson, 1843

Genus of gastropods

Tricula is a genus of freshwater snails with a gill and an operculum, aquatic gastropod mollusks in the family Pomatiopsidae.

Tricula is the type genus of the tribe Triculuni.

== Species ==
Species in the genus Tricula include:

- Tricula bambooensis
- Tricula bollingi Davis, 1968
- Tricula chiui -
- Tricula fujianensis (Liu, et al., 1983)
- Tricula godawariensis Nesemann & Sharma, 2007
- Tricula gravelyi B. Prashad, 1921
- Tricula gregoriana Annandale, 1924
- Tricula hongshanensis Tang et al., 1986
- Tricula horae T. N. Annandale & Rao, 1925
- Tricula hortensis Attwood & Brown, 2003
- Tricula hsiangi Kang, 1984
- Tricula humida
- Tricula jianouensis Cheng et al., 2009
- Tricula ludongbini
- Tricula mahadevensis Nesemann & Sharma, 2007
- Tricula martini Rao, 1928
- Tricula montana Benson, 1843 - type species
- Tricula pingi Kang, 1984
- Tricula taylori Rao, 1928
- Tricula wumingensis Hu et al., 1994
- Tricula xiaolongmenensis
