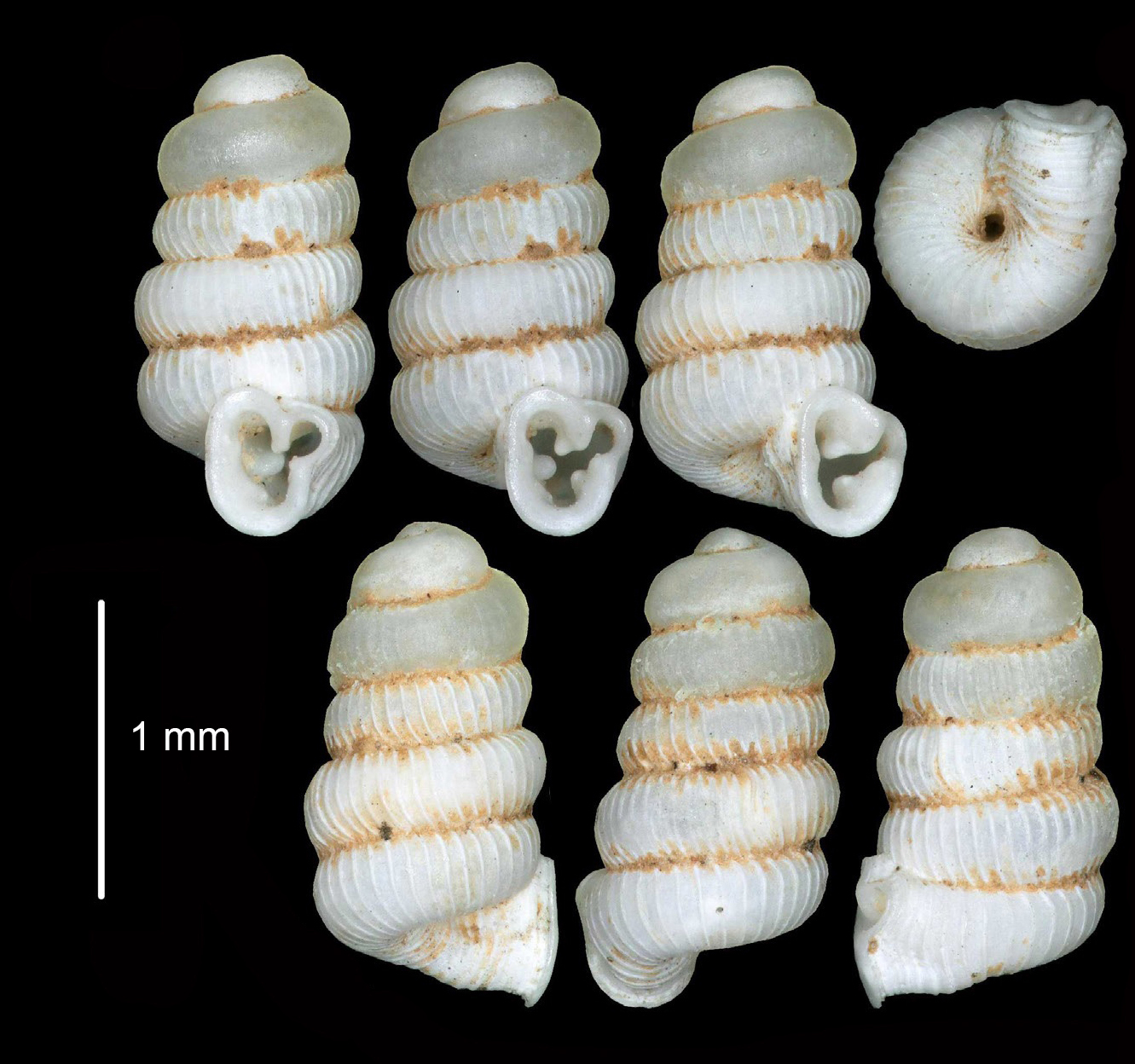
- Shell of Sinoennea variabilis (specimen at MNHN, Paris)

Scientific classification
- Kingdom: Animalia
- Phylum: Mollusca
- Class: Gastropoda
- Order: Stylommatophora
- Suborder: Achatinina
- Superfamily: Streptaxoidea
- Family: Diapheridae
- Genus: Sinoennea; Kobelt, 1904

Type species
- Pupa strophiodes Gredler, 1881

Other species
- see text

Synonyms
- Ennea (Indoennea) Kobelt, 1904 (junior synonym); Ennea (Sinoennea) Kobelt, 1904 (original rank); Gulella (Sinoennea) Kobelt, 1904; Indoennea Kobelt, 1904 (junior synonym); Sinoennea (Sinoennea) Kobelt, 1904· accepted, alternate representation

= Sinoennea =

Genus of gastropods

Sinoennea is a genus of air-breathing land snails, terrestrial pulmonate gastropod mollusks in the family Diapheridae.

== Etymology ==
The name of the genus Sinoennea originates from Sino- (Chinese) + Ennea.

== Distribution ==
The distribution of Sinoennea includes South of India, Indochina, China (South of Yangtze River and Taiwan), Malaysian Peninsula in Malaysia and Thailand, Sumatra, Japan and South Korea.

== Description ==
The shell of Sinoennea has 6-7 whorls. The whorls are swelling.

== Taxonomy ==
This genus used to belong to the families Streptaxidae and Diapheridae, but the newest assigned it to the Family Enneinae.

== Species ==
Species in the genus Sinoennea include:

- Sinoennea angustistoma Páll-Gergely, A. Reischütz & Maassen, 2020
- Sinoennea apicata van Benthem Jutting, 1961
- Sinoennea atomaria (Dautzenberg, 1894)
- Sinoennea attenuata van Benthem Jutting, 1961
- Sinoennea austeni (Peile, 1929)
- Sinoennea bacca van Benthem Jutting, 1961
- Sinoennea baculum van Benthem Jutting, 1961
- Sinoennea bhucylindrica E. Gittenberger & Leda, 2021
- Sinoennea blanfordiana (Godwin-Austen, 1872)
- Sinoennea butleri (Peile, 1929)
- Sinoennea callizonus van Benthem Jutting, 1961
- Sinoennea calva (Dautzenberg, 1894)
- Sinoennea cava (Pilsbry & Hirase, 1908)
- Sinoennea charasensis Tomlin, 1941
- Sinoennea chintamanensis Tomlin, 1941
- Sinoennea chrysallis van Benthem Jutting, 1961
- Sinoennea copiaensis Do Duc Sang & Do Van Nhuong, 2015
- Sinoennea crumenilla van Benthem Jutting, 1961
- Sinoennea dactylus van Benthem Jutting, 1961
- Sinoennea densecostata (O. Boettger, 1892)
- Sinoennea duplicaria (Pilsbry, 1926)
- Sinoennea euryomphala Inkhavilay & Panha, 2016
- Sinoennea fartoidea (Theobald, 1870)
- Sinoennea fuchsi (Gredler, 1885)
- Sinoennea fuzhouensis W.-C. Zhou, D.-N. Chen & J-X. Guo, 2006
- Sinoennea glebula van Benthem Jutting, 1961
- Sinoennea guiyangensis T.-C. Luo, D.-N. Chen & G.-Q. Zhang, 1998
- Sinoennea hippocrepis (Bavay & Dautzenberg, 1912)
- Sinoennea hungerfordiana (Möllendorff, 1887)
- Sinoennea infantilis Páll-Gergely & Grego, 2020
- Sinoennea insularis (Minato, 1974)
- Sinoennea irregularis (Möllendorff, 1900)
- Sinoennea iwakawa (Pilsbry, 1900)
  - Sinoennea iwakawa yakushimae
- Sinoennea kanchingensis Tomlin, 1948
- Sinoennea karnekampi Maassen, 1999
- Sinoennea kennethi Vermeulen, 2007
- Sinoennea kermorganti (Ancey, 1881)
- Sinoennea kwangsiensis Yen, 1939
- Sinoennea larvula (Heude, 1882)
- Sinoennea latens Peile, 1935
- Sinoennea lembingensis Tomlin, 1941
- Sinoennea lenggongensis Tomlin, 1939
- Sinoennea lepida van Benthem Jutting, 1961
- Sinoennea leucostolos van Benthem Jutting, 1961
- Sinoennea lizae Maassen, 2008
- Sinoennea ljudmilena Páll-Gergely, 2020
- Sinoennea loeiensis Tanmuangpak & S. Tumpeesuwan, 2015
- Sinoennea longtangshanensis Zhang et al., 2015
- Sinoennea macrodonta (Bavay & Dautzenberg, 1912)
- Sinoennea malaccana (Möllendorff, 1902)
- Sinoennea manyunensis B. Fan, M. Tian & Y.-X. Chen, 2014
- Sinoennea maolanensis T.-C. Luo, W.-C. Zhou & D.-N. Chen, 2004
- Sinoennea menglunensis P. Wang, Y-J. Chen, W.-C. Zhou & C.-C. Hwang, 2015
- Sinoennea micropleuris (Möllendorff, 1887)
- Sinoennea milium (Godwin-Austen, 1876)
- Sinoennea miyakojimana (Pilsbry & Hirase, 1904)
- Sinoennea moerchiana (G. Nevill, 1881)
- Sinoennea montawana Páll-Gergely & Hunyadi, 2020
- Sinoennea nagaensis (W. T. Blanford, 1899)
- Sinoennea nimai E. Gittenberger & Gyeltshen, 2021
- Sinoennea otostoma Páll-Gergely, A. Reischütz & Maassen, 2020
- Sinoennea pagodella van Benthem Jutting, 1961
- Sinoennea panhai Páll-Gergely & Hunyadi, 2020
- Sinoennea perakensis (Godwin-Austen & G. Nevill, 1879)
- Sinoennea plagiostoma (Möllendorff, 1901)
- Sinoennea prima Panha & J. B. Burch, 1999
- Sinoennea pupoidea W.-C. Zhou, W.-H. Zhang & D.-N. Chen, 2009
- Sinoennea ranongensis Panha, 2005
- Sinoennea reischuetzorum Maassen, 2016
- Sinoennea ridley (Piele, 1926)
- Sinoennea shizhongshanensis J. Jiang, D.-N. Chen, X.-P. Wu & S. Ouyang, 2014
- Sinoennea stenopylis (Benson, 1860)
- Sinoennea strophiodes (Gredler, 1881)
- Sinoennea stunensis Dumrongrojwattana & Wongkamhaeng, 2013
- Sinoennea subcylindrica (Möllendorff, 1891)
- Sinoennea sumatrensis van Benthem Jutting, 1959
- Sinoennea sutchariti Páll-Gergely & Hunyadi, 2020
- Sinoennea tiarella van Benthem Jutting, 1961
- Sinoennea tweediei Tomlin, 1941
- Sinoennea vara (Benson, 1859)
- Sinoennea variabilis Páll-Gergely & Grego, 2020
- Sinoennea woodthorpei (Peile, 1929)
- Sinoennea yonakunijimana (Pilsbry & Hirase, 1909)
- Sinoennea ziminae H.-F. Yang, Z.-Y. Fan, D.-D. Qiao & J. He, 2012

Species brought into synonymy

- Sinoennea aliena (Bavay & Dautzenberg, 1912): synonym of Nagyelma aliena (Bavay & Dautzenberg, 1912) (unaccepted combination)
- Sinoennea beddomei (W. T. Blanford, 1881): synonym of Rowsonia beddomei (W. T. Blanford, 1881) (unaccepted combination)
- Sinoennea bongi Dance, 1970: synonym of Bruggennea bongi (Dance, 1970) (original combination)
- Sinoennea canarica (W. T. Blanford, 1881): synonym of Rowsonia canarica (W. T. Blanford, 1881) (unaccepted combination)
- Sinoennea chatasensis Tomlin, 1941: synonym of Sinoennea charasensis Tomlin, 1941 (incorrect original spelling)
- Sinoennea demangei (Bavay & Dautzenberg, 1912): synonym of Parasinoennea demangei (Bavay & Dautzenberg, 1912) (unaccepted combination)
- Sinoennea exilis (W. T. Blanford, 1881): synonym of Platylennea exilis (W. T. Blanford, 1881) (unaccepted combination)
- Sinoennea fargesiana (Heude, 1890): synonym of Sinoennea fuchsi (Gredler, 1885) (junior synonym)
- Sinoennea formica (Bavay & Dautzenberg, 1912): synonym of Parasinoennea formica (Bavay & Dautzenberg, 1912) (unaccepted combination)
- Sinoennea laidlawi Dance, 1970: synonym of Bruggennea laidlawi (Dance, 1970) (original combination)
- Sinoennea levis Peile, 1935: synonym of Platylennea levis (Peile, 1935) (original combination)
- Sinoennea longtanensis S. Ouyang, X.-M. Liu & X.-P. Wu, 2012: synonym of Parasinoennea splendens (Möllendorff, 1882) (junior synonym)
- Sinoennea macrodon (W. T. Blanford, 1881): synonym of Platylennea macrodon (W. T. Blanford, 1881) (unaccepted combination)
- Sinoennea microstoma (Möllendorff, 1881): synonym of Elma microstoma (Möllendorff, 1881) (unaccepted combination)
- Sinoennea ovulum (Bavay & Dautzenberg, 1912): synonym of Parasinoennea ovulum (Bavay & Dautzenberg, 1912) (unaccepted combination)
- Sinoennea pirriei (L. Pfeiffer, 1855): synonym of Rowsonia pirriei (L. Pfeiffer, 1855) (unaccepted combination)
- Sinoennea planguncula (Benson, 1863): synonym of Pupennea planguncula (W. H. Benson, 1863) (unaccepted combination)
- Sinoennea sculpta (W. T. Blanford, 1869): synonym of Rowsonia sculpta (W. T. Blanford, 1869) (unaccepted combination)
- Sinoennea siputana Tomlin, 1938: synonym of Sinoennea subcylindrica (Möllendorff, 1891) (junior synonym)
- Sinoennea splendens (Möllendorff, 1882): synonym of Parasinoennea splendens (Möllendorff, 1882) (unaccepted combination)
- Sinoennea subcostulata (W. T. Blanford, 1881): synonym of Platylennea subcostulata (W. T. Blanford, 1881) (unaccepted combination)
- Sinoennea turricula (W. T. Blanford, 1899): synonym of Rowsonia turricula (W. T. Blanford, 1899) (unaccepted combination)
