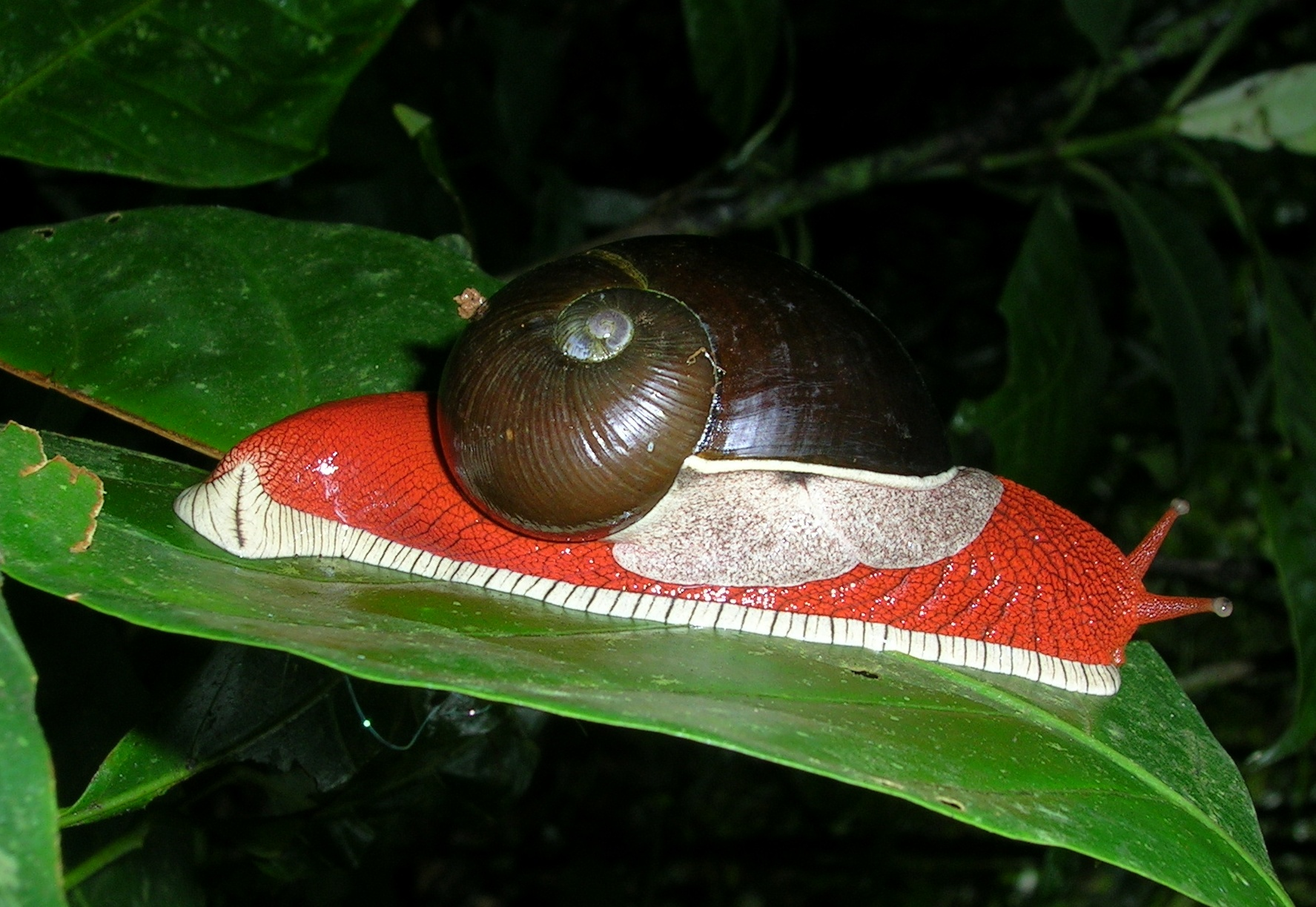

Scientific classification
- Kingdom: Animalia
- Phylum: Mollusca
- Class: Gastropoda
- Order: Stylommatophora
- Family: Ariophantidae
- Genus: Indrella; Godwin-Austen, 1901
- Species: I. ampulla

Binomial name
- Indrella ampulla (Benson, 1850)

= Indrella =

Genus of mollusc

Indrella is a monotypic genus containing the single species Indrella ampulla, a tropical terrestrial air-breathing gastropod mollusk in the family Ariophantidae. It is endemic to the Western Ghats of India.

I. ampulla is the only species in the genus Indrella. However the animal has polymorphic coloration: The visible soft parts of the snail can be various colors such as red, yellow, brown and orange.

== Shell description ==
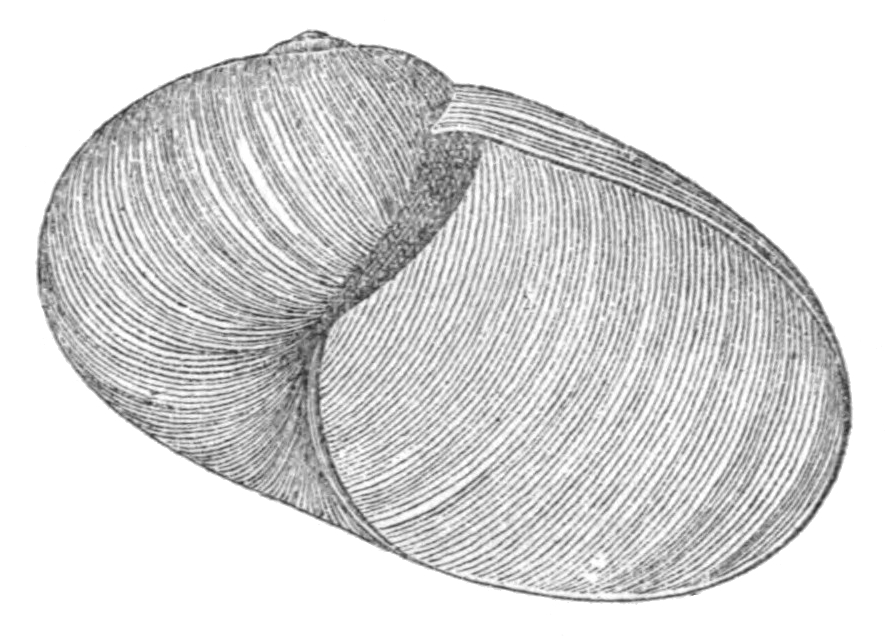
A drawing of the shell of Indrella ampulla

The shell of this species is like that of Vitrina, imperforate, with few whorls and with a very large aperture. The shell consists mainly of proteins with only small amounts of calcium carbonate.

The shell is obliquely ovate and globose in shape and very thin. Half the thickness consists of epidermis, marked throughout with plicate line of growth, crossed by faint impressed spiral lines, and on the last whorl by shallow irregular furrows. The color of the shell can be brownish olive, dark brown and black. Spire is small, convex and obtuse. The number of whorls is 3 and a half, rapidly increasing, the last much larger, rounded at the periphery and beneath. The aperture is very large, oblique, roundly oval, the same colour within as without, but smooth and glossy. The peristome is thin, membranaceous, columellar margin much curved inwards.

The width of the shell is 38–63 mm. The height is 30 mm. The width of the aperture is 32 mm and the height of aperture is 30 mm.

== Anatomy ==
The external soft parts are similar to those of Ariophanta, but larger, and not fully retractile within the shell. The mucous pore is of moderate size, there is no distinct overhanging lobe or a small one. The sole of the foot is undivided and very smooth. There are no shell-lobes. The dorsal lobes are well developed, the left divided into an anterior and a posterior part by a deep sinus. Kalc-sac small, receiving the vas deferens; retractor muscle attached to long straight caecum given off at the junction of the flagellum of the male organ. The spermatheca is oval, very short, on a short stem. The amatorial organ (the dart-sac) is stout and long.

=== Radula ===
The jaw is straight, with a slight convexity on the cutting-edge and no median projection. The radula is broad, with about 100 rows of teeth: 145 .17 .1 .17 .145; median tooth and the 17 on each side (admedians) long, broadly pointed, straight-sided, lateral cusps indistinct; laterals curved, aculeate, outer laterals bicuspid.

=== Color of the soft parts ===
"The animal, as represented in a drawing for which I am indebted to Sir Walter Elliot, is greenish yellow, but according to Col. Beddome it is black. It probably varies."

The color of soft parts has great color diversity, (color polymorphism) including white, cream, pale yellow, orange, red and black. Cream color morphs are only found in Wayanad district, Kerala.

== Distribution ==
This species occurs in the Western Ghats of India, specifically on the wetter western slopes of the Wynaad, Nilgiri, and Anaimalai Hills, at moderate elevations (3000 ft).

== Habitat ==
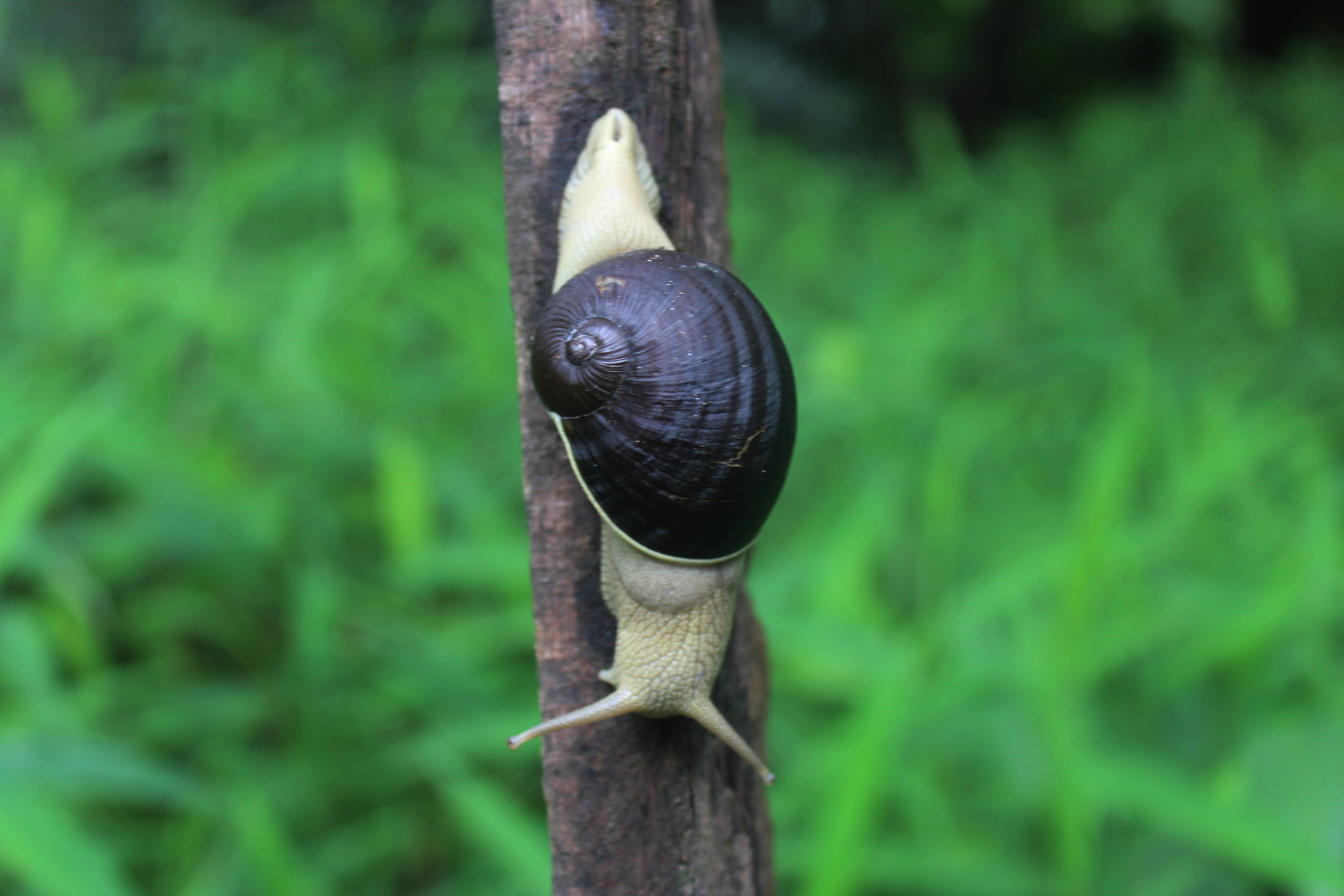
From Wayanad district, Kerala.

This species lives in wet woodland, i.e. tropical rainforest.

== Ecology ==
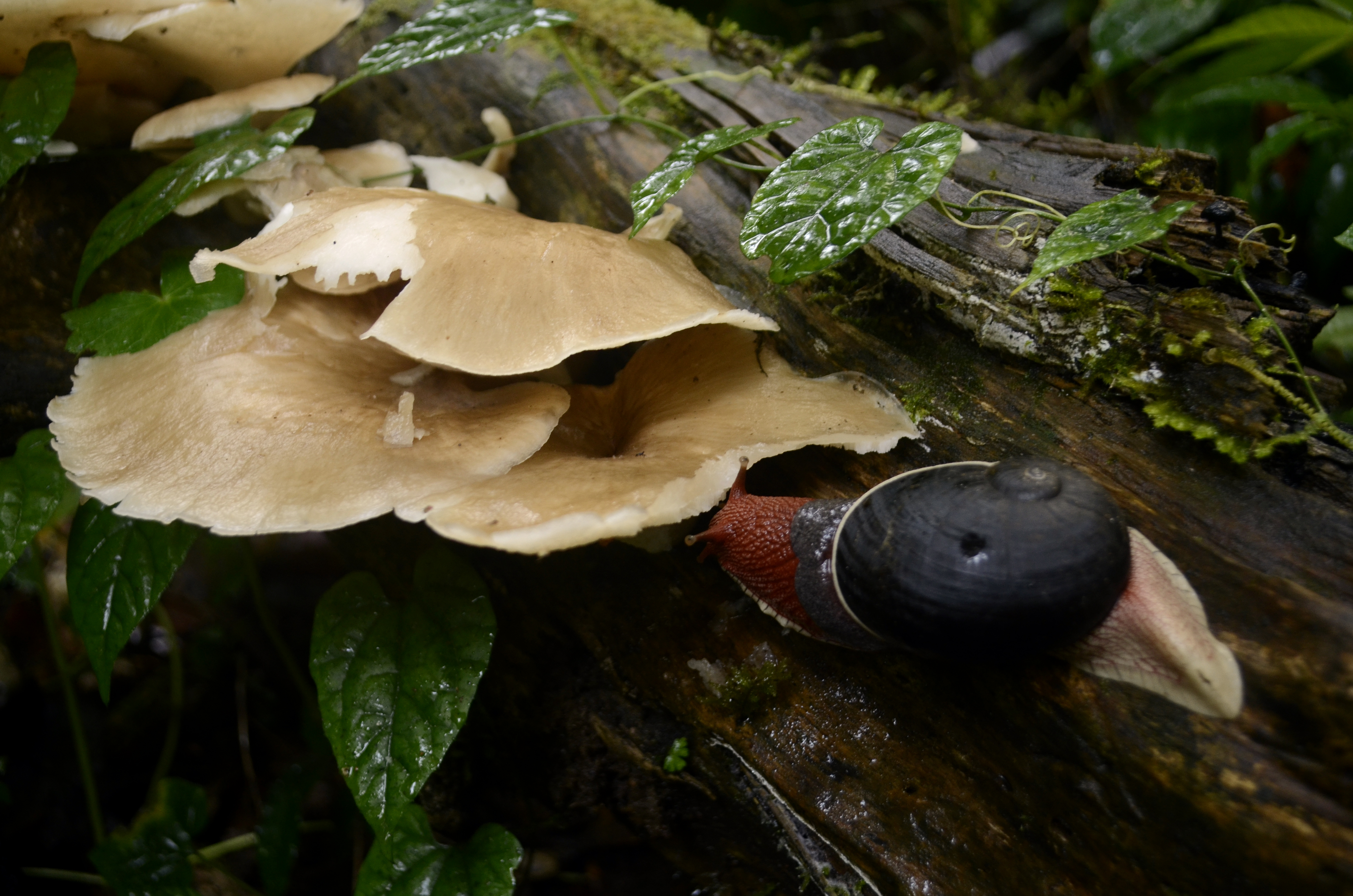
Indrella ampulla feeding on a large fungi, at Parambikulam Tiger Reserve, Anamalai hills, Southern Western Ghats, India

I. ampulla is largely terrestrial, being spotted on the forest floor while occasionally crossing the forest roads. Although it is a terrestrial snail it has been known to be partly arboreal. This species is reported to be submerged underwater for about 30 minutes while upper tentacles occasionally breaking the water surface.

Colonel Richard Henry Beddome of the British Indian forest service had observed it feeding on large fungi. Their diet primarily consists of fungi and decaying organic matter.
