= List of non-marine molluscs of China =

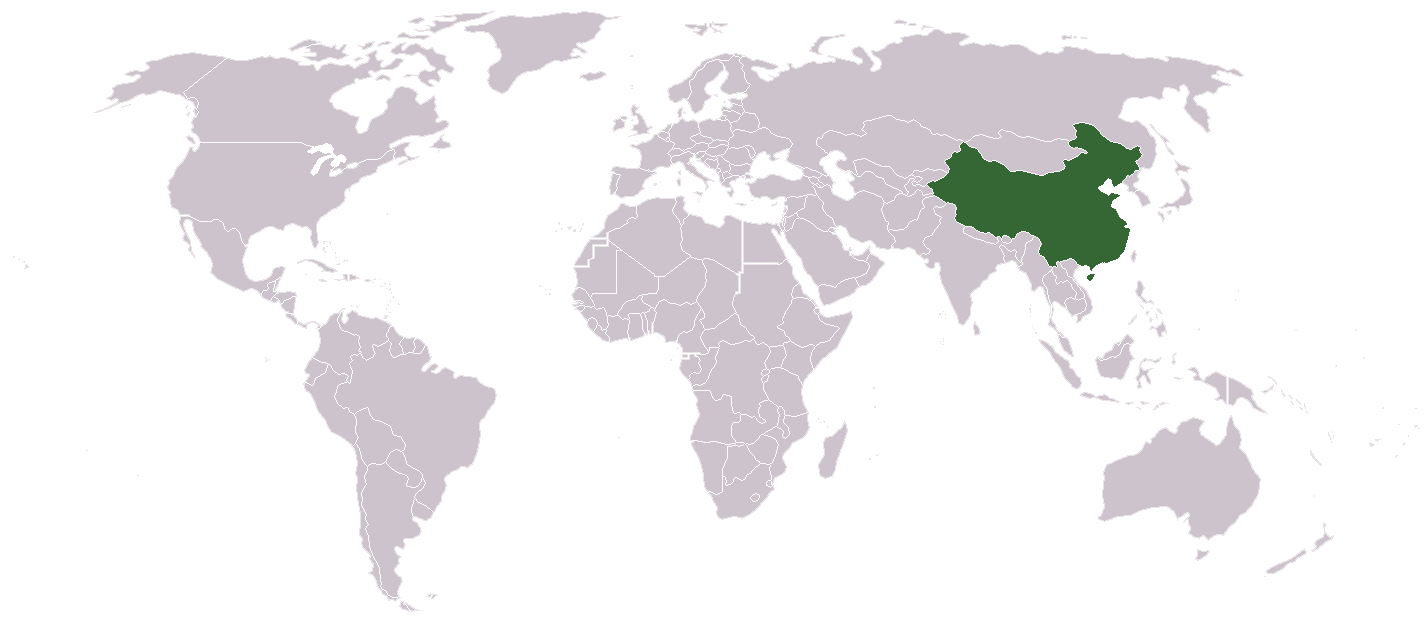
Location of China

The non-marine mollusks of China are a part of the molluscan fauna of China (wildlife of China). A number of species of non-marine mollusks are found in the wild in China.

== Freshwater gastropods ==
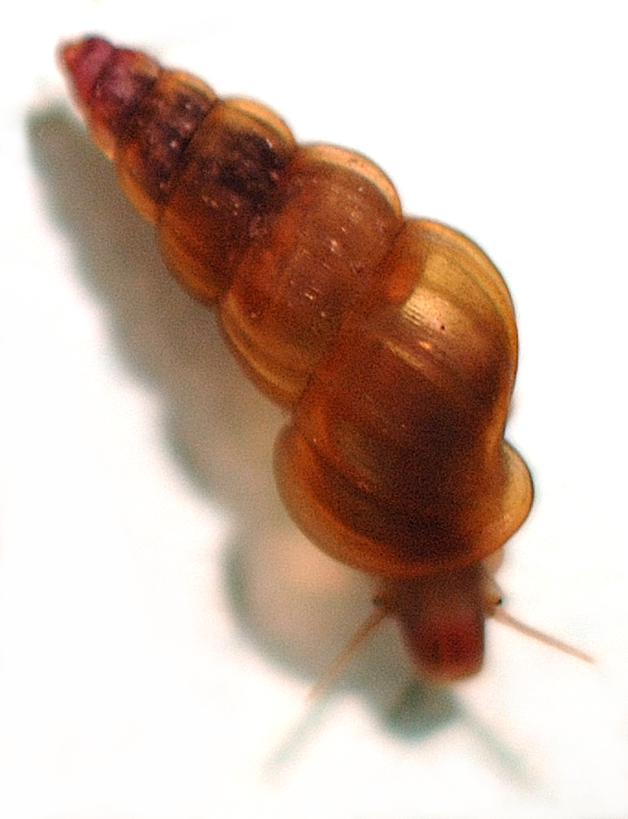
Oncomelania hupensis is medically important in China because it can transfer Schistosoma japonicum, which causes schistosomiasis.

Amnicolidae

- Erhaia chinensis (Liu & Zhang, 1979)
- Erhaia daliensis Davis & Kuo in Davis et al., 1985
- Erhaia gongjianguoi (Kang, 1983)
- Erhaia hubeiensis (Liu, Zhang & Wang, 1983)
- Erhaia jianouensis (Liu & Zhang, 1979)
- Erhaia kunmingensis Davis & Kuo in Davis et al., 1985
- Erhaia lii (Kang, 1985)
- Erhaia liui (Kang, 1985)
- Erhaia robusta (Kang, 1986)
- Erhaia shimenensis (Liu, Zhang & Chen, 1982)
- Erhaia tangi (Cheng, Wu, Li & Lin, 2007)
- Erhaia triodonta (Liu, Wang & Zhang, 1991)
- Erhaia wantanensis (Kang, 1983)
- Erhaia wufungensis (Kang, 1983)

Viviparidae

- genus Margarya

Pomatiopsidae

- Fenouilia kreitneri Neumayr, 1880 - endemic
- Lacunopsis auris Y.-Y. Liu, Y.-X. Wang & W.-Z. Zhang, 1980
- Lacunopsis yunnanensis Y.-Y. Liu, Y.-X. Wang & W.-Z. Zhang, 1980
- Lacunopsis yuxiensis Shi, Shu, Qiang, Xu, Tian & Chang, 2020
- Oncomelania hupensis Gredler, 1881
- Tricula hortensis Attwood & Brown, 2003

Pachychilidae

- Brotia yunnanensis Köhler, Du & Yang, 2010

Thiaridae

- Melanoides tuberculata (O. F. Müller, 1774) - red-rimmed melania

== Land gastropods ==
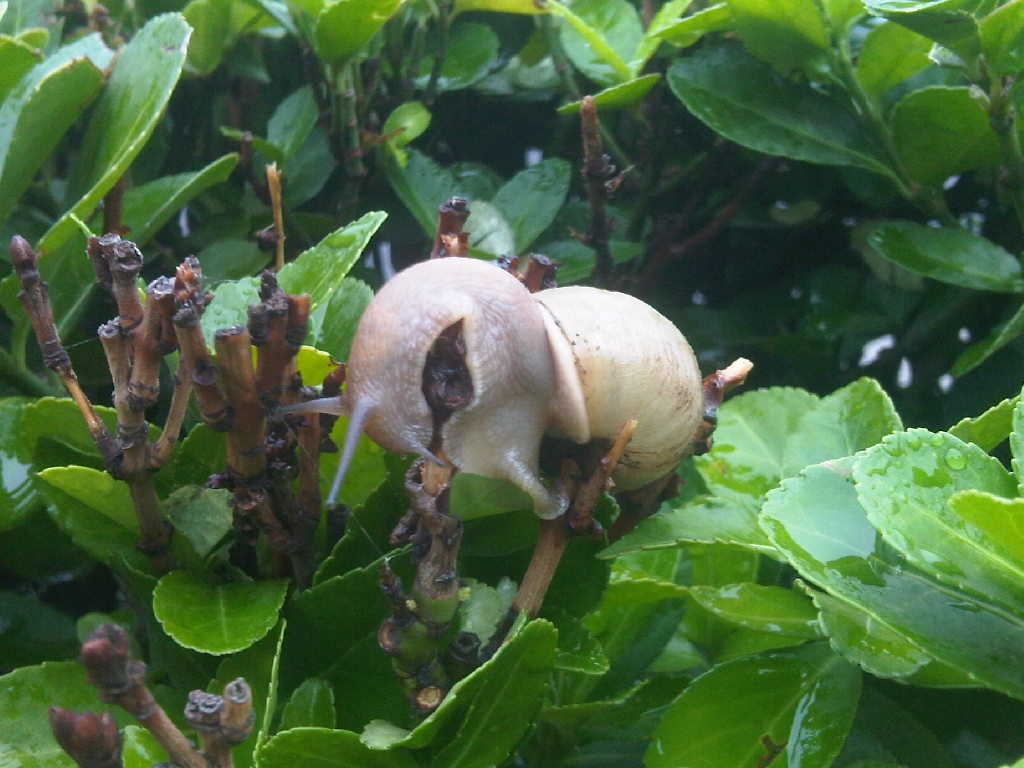
An unidentified land snail from China

Cyclophoridae

- Cyclophorus aquilus (Sowerby, 1843)
- Cyclophorus clouthianus Möllendorff, 1882
- Cyclophorus dilatatus Heude, 1886
- Cyclophorus dodrans dodrans Mabille, 1887
- Cyclophorus fargesianus Heude, 1885
- Cyclophorus martensianus Möllendorff, 1874
- Cyclophorus pyrostoma Möllendorff, 1882
- Cyclophorus volvulus (O.F. Müller, 1774)
- Cyclophorus zebrinus (Benson, 1836)
- Scabrina fimbriosa (Möllendorff, 1885)
- Scabrina hirsuta (Möllendorff, 1884)
- Scabrina laciniata (Heude, 1885)
- Scabrina moellendorffi (Preston, 1909)

Alycaeidae

- Pincerna costulosa (Bavay & Dautzenberg, 1912)
- Pincerna maolanensis Luo, Zhang & Zhuo, 2009
- Pincerna vallis Chen & Wu, 2020

Diplommatinidae

- Arinia cathaicola Pilsbry, 1934
- Sinoarinia feii Chen, 2020
- Sinoarinia maolanensis (Zhang, Chen & Zhuo, 2013)
- Sinoarinia mirifica (Li, Zhuo & Luo, 2005)

Enidae

- Pupopsis dissociabilis Sturany, 1900
- Pupopsis hendan Wu & Gao, 2010
- Pupopsis maoxian Wu & Gao, 2010
- Pupopsis paraplesia Sturany, 1900
- Pupopsis polystrepta Sturany, 1900
- Pupopsis pupopsis Gredler, 1898
- Pupopsis retrodens (Martens, 1879)
- Pupopsis rhodostoma Wu & Gao, 2010
- Pupopsis subpupopsis Wu & Gao, 2010
- Pupopsis subtorquilla Wu & Gao, 2010
- Pupopsis torquilla (Möllendorff, 1901)
- Pupopsis yengiawat Wu & Gao, 2010
- Pupopsis yuxu Wu & Gao, 2010
- Pupopsis zilchi Wu & Gao, 2010
- Subzebrinus labiellus (Martens, 1881)

Strobilopsidae

- Eostrobilops diodontina (Heude, 1885)
- Eostrobilops humicolus Páll-Gergely et Hunyadi, 2015
- Eostrobilops zijinshanicus Chen, 2019

Clausiliidae

- Acanthophaedusa reductans Grego & Szekeres, 2011
- Bacillophaedusa annularis Grego & Szekeres, 2011
- Bathyptychia (Bathyptychia) beresowskii flavida Nordsieck, 2005
- Bathyptychia (Bathyptychia) martensi Nordsieck, 2001
- Bathyptychia (Bathyptychia) zechuani Grego & Szekeres, 2020
- Cirrophaedusa plicilabris Grego & Szekeres, 2011
- Dautzenbergiella (Dautzenbergiella) chinensis Nordsieck, 2007
- Dautzenbergiella (Dautzenbergiella) leekremeri Grego & Szekeres, 2020
- Dautzenbergiella (Mansuyiella) mansuyi ootanii Nordsieck, 2007
- Dautzenbergiella (Mansuyiella) paulae Grego & Szekeres, 2017
- Dautzenbergiella (Dautzenbergiella) yanghaoi Grego & Szekeres, 2020
- Distortiphaedusa imprimata Grego & Szekeres, 2011
- Euphaedusa costifera Nordsieck, 2001
- Euphaedusa gemina davidi Nordsieck, 2001
- Euphaedusa (Telophaedusa) ishibei Nordsieck, 2007
- Euphaedusa krejcii Nordsieck, 2001
- Euphaedusa (Papilliphaedusa) yongshuae Nordsieck, 2007
- Euphaedusa yunnancola Nordsieck, 2001
- Falsiluna harryleei Grego & Szekeres, 2011
- Formosana abscedens Hunyadi et Szekeres, 2016
- Formosana kremeri Grego & Szekeres, 2017
- Formosana renzhigangi Grego & Szekeres, 2019
- Formosana schawalleri Nordsieck, 2001
- Formosana seguiniana (Heude, 1885)
- Fuchsiana zhangqingae Grego & Szekeres, 2017
- Grandinenia maroskoi Grego & Szekeres, 2011
- Grandinenia ookuboi pulchricosta Nordsieck, 2007
- Grandinenia rex Nordsieck, 2007
- Grandinenia takagii gigas Nordsieck, 2007
- Hemiphaedusa (Synprosphyma) ehrmanni Nordsieck, 2001
- Hemiphaedusa (Margaritiphaedusa) macroptychia Nordsieck, 2007
- Hemiphaedusa (Notoptychia) media Nordsieck, 2005
- Hemiphaedusa (Selenophaedusa) ooharai Nordsieck, 2007
- Hemiphaedusa (Hemiphaedusa) pluviatilis zilchi Nordsieck, 2001
- Hemiphaedusa (Notoptychia) polydonella Nordsieck, 2005
- Hemiphaedusa (Margaritiphaedusa) protrita hunancola Nordsieck, 2001
- Hemiphaedusa (Synprosphyma) pseudinversa Nordsieck, 2001
- Hemiphaedusa (Margaritiphaedusa) rusticana amoena Nordsieck, 2001
- Hemiphaedusa (Dendrophaedusa) spinifera Nordsieck, 2005
- Macrophaedusella jesuitica Nordsieck, 2001
- Margaritiphaedusa hunyadii Grego & Szekeres, 2017
- Margaritiphaedusa whitteni kremerorum Grego & Szekeres, 2017
- Miraphaedusa takagii Nordsieck, 2005
- Oospira (Siphonophaedusa) grangeri asiphonia Nordsieck, 2007
- Oospira (Formosana) kongshanensis Nordsieck, 2007
- Oospira (Formosana) moschinella Nordsieck, 2007
- Oospira (Formosana) ooharai Nordsieck, 2007
- Oospira (Atractophaedusa) ookuboi Nordsieck, 2005
- Oospira (Formosana) schwalleri Nordsieck, 2001
- Oospira (Formosana) splendens Nordsieck, 2005
- Oospira (Atractophaedusa) takagii Nordsieck, 2005
- Oospira (Formosana) umbrosa Nordsieck, 2007
- Oospira yanghaoi Grego & Szekeres, 2017
- Oospira (Atractophaedusa) zhaoyifani Grego & Szekeres, 2008
- Papilliphaedusa kunmingensis (Chen et Zhang, 1999)
- Phaedusa (Phaedusa) boettgeri Nordsieck, 2001
- Phaedusa (Phaedusa) lypra latestriata Nordsieck, 2007
- Phaedusa (Metaphaedusa) matejkoi Grego & Szekeres, 2011
- Phaedusa (Metaphaedusa) pallidocincta ookuboi Nordsieck, 2005
- Phaedusa (Phaedusa) potanini pretiosa Nordsieck, 2001
- Phaedusa (Metaphaedusa) pseudaculus Nordsieck, 2001
- Probosciphaedusa mulini Chen & Ouyang, 2021
- Selenophaedusa diplochilus griffithsi Grego & Szekeres, 2011
- Selenophaedusa jimenezi Grego & Szekeres, 2017
- Serriphaedusa boissieaui Grego & Szekeres, 2011
- Serriphaedusa (Gibbophaedusa) gerberi Grego & Szekeres, 2019
- Serriphaedusa ookuboi Nordsieck, 2007
- Serriphaedusa (Gibbophaedusa) poppei Grego & Szekeres, 2017
- Serriphaedusa (Serriphaedusa) tenuispira Grego & Szekeres, 2020
- Serriphaedusa (Altiplica) yanghaoi Grego & Szekeres, 2017
- Serriphaedusa (Gibbophaedusa) zhangqingae Grego & Szekeres, 2020
- Synprosphyma ambigua Grego & Szekeres, 2017
- Synprosphyma (Synprosphyma) basilissa planicollis Nordsieck, 2007
- Synprosphyma segersi Grego & Szekeres, 2017
- Synprosphyma yanghaoi Grego & Szekeres, 2011
- Synprosphyma yunlingi Grego & Szekeres, 2020
- Tropidauchenia (Grandinenia) capreolus Nordsieck, 2005
- Tropidauchenia (Grandinenia) costigera Nordsieck, 2005
- Tropidauchenia danjuan Qiu, 2021
- Tropidauchenia (Grandinenia) fuchsi amabilis Nordsieck, 2005
- Tropidauchenia (Grandinenia) gastrum Nordsieck, 2005
  - Tropidauchenia (Grandinenia) gastrum densecostulata Nordsieck, 2005
  - Tropidauchenia (Grandinenia) gastrum laticosta Nordsieck, 2005
- Tropidauchenia (Tropidauchenia) hitomiae Nordsieck, 2007
  - Tropidauchenia (Tropidauchenia) hitomiae rufescens Nordsieck, 2007
- Tropidauchenia (Tropidauchenia) lucida Nordsieck, 2007
  - Tropidauchenia (Tropidauchenia) lucida gracillima Nordsieck, 2007
- Tropidauchenia (Tropidauchenia) nakaharai Nordsieck, 2007
- Tropidauchenia (Tropidauchenia) napoensis Nordsieck, 2007
- Tropidauchenia (Grandinenia) ookuboi Nordsieck, 2005
- Tropidauchenia (Tropidauchenia) ootanii Nordsieck, 2007
- Tropidauchenia (Tropidauchenia) orientalis rufocincta Nordsieck, 2007
- Tropidauchenia parasulcicollis Qiu, 2021
- Tropidauchenia (Grandinenia) pseudofuchsi Nordsieck, 2005
- Tropidauchenia sulcicollis Grego & Szekeres, 2017
- Tropidauchenia (Grandinenia) takagii rubens Nordsieck, 2005
- Tropidauchenia yanghaoi Grego & Szekeres, 2017

Arionidae

- Arion subfuscus (Draparnaud, 1805)

Philomycidae

- Meghimatium bilineatum (Benson, 1842)
- Meghimatium cf. pictum (Stoliczka, 1873)
- Meghimatium rugosum (Chen & Gao, 1982)

Anadenidae

- Anadenus dautzenbergi Collinge, 1900 - nomen dubium
- Anadenus parvipenis Wiktor, De-niu & Wu, 2000
- Anadenus sechuenensis Collinge, 1899
- Anadenus sinensis Möllendorff, 1899 - nomen dubium
- Anadenus yangtzeensis Wiktor, De-niu & Wu, 2000
- Anadenus yunnanensis Wiktor, De-niu & Wu, 2000
- Anadenus gonggashanensis Wiktor, De-niu & Wu, 2000

Limacidae

- Ambigolimax valentianus (Férussac, 1823)
- Limacus flavus Linnaeus, 1758

Agriolimacidae

- Deroceras altaicum (Simroth, 1886)
- Deroceras laeve (O.F. Müller, 1774)

Hypselostomatidae

- Angustopila dominikae Páll-Gergely & Hunyadi, 2015
- Angustopila fabella Páll-Gergely & Hunyadi, 2015
- Angustopila huoyani Jochum, Slapnik & Páll-Gergely, 2014
- Angustopila subelevata Páll-Gergely & Hunyadi, 2015
- Angustopila szekeresi Páll-Gergely & Hunyadi, 2015
- Clostophis lacrima Páll-Gergely & Hunyadi, 2015
- Hypselostoma socialis Páll-Gergely & Hunyadi, 2015
- Krobylos sinensis Páll-Gergely & Hunyadi, 2015

Bradybaenidae

- “Pupopsis” soleniscus (Möllendorff, 1901)
- genus Stilpnodiscus - endemic to China

Diapheridae

- Sinoennea Kobelt, 1904
  - Sinoennea guiyangensis T.-C. Luo, D.-N. Chen & G.-Q. Zhang, 1998
  - Sinoennea manyunensis B. Fan, M. Tian & Y.-X. Chen, 2014
  - Sinoennea maolanensis T.-C. Luo, W.-C. Zhou & D.-N. Chen, 2004

Plectopylidae

- Sicradiscus mansuyi (Gude, 1908)

== Freshwater bivalves ==
Sphaeriidae

- Odhneripisidium stewarti Preston, 1909

Corbiculidae

- Corbicula fluminea (O. F. Müller, 1774) Found throughout eastern Asia, now an invasive species in waterways throughout Europe, Australia, and the Americas.

== See also ==
- Environment of China
- Conservation in China
- List of marine molluscs of China
- List of non-marine molluscs of Hong Kong
- List of non-marine molluscs of Taiwan

Lists of molluscs of surrounding countries:

- List of non-marine molluscs of North Korea
- List of non-marine molluscs of South Korea
- List of non-marine molluscs of Russia
- List of non-marine molluscs of Mongolia
- List of non-marine molluscs of Kazakhstan
- List of non-marine molluscs of Kyrgyzstan
- List of non-marine molluscs of Tajikistan
- List of non-marine molluscs of Afghanistan
- List of non-marine molluscs of Pakistan
- List of non-marine molluscs of India
- List of non-marine molluscs of Nepal
- List of non-marine molluscs of Bhutan
- List of non-marine molluscs of Burma
- List of non-marine molluscs of Vietnam
- List of non-marine molluscs of the Philippines
- List of non-marine molluscs of Japan
