= Tricula hortensis =

Scientific classification
- Domain: Eukaryota
- Kingdom: Animalia
- Phylum: Mollusca
- Class: Gastropoda
- Subclass: Caenogastropoda
- Order: Littorinimorpha
- Family: Pomatiopsidae
- Genus: Tricula
- Species: T. hortensis

Binomial name
- Tricula hortensis Attwood & Brown, 2003

Species of gastropod

Tricula hortensis is a species of freshwater snail with a gill and an operculum, an aquatic gastropod mollusk in the family Pomatiopsidae.

== Distribution ==
This species of freshwater snail occurs in China.

== Genetics ==
The complete mitochondrial genome of Tricula hortensis was published in 2010. Its length is 15,179 nucleotides and it contains 13 genes.

== Parasites ==
Tricula hortensis is an intermediate host for Schistosoma sinensium.
