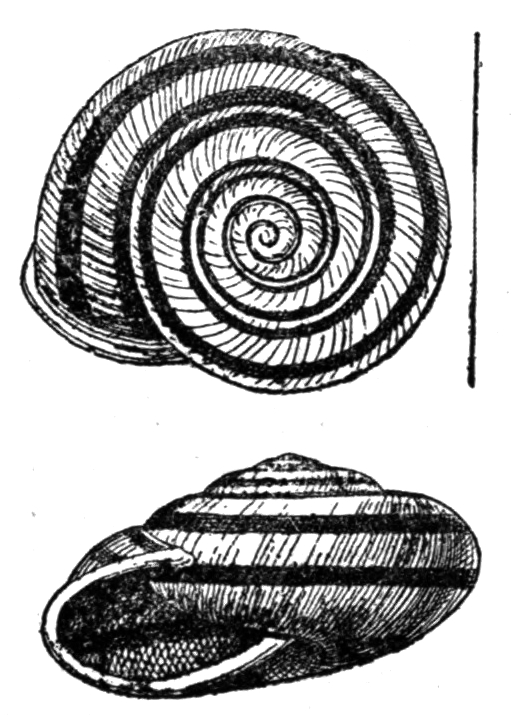
- shell of Ariophanta laevipes

Scientific classification
- Domain: Eukaryota
- Kingdom: Animalia
- Phylum: Mollusca
- Class: Gastropoda
- Order: Stylommatophora
- Family: Ariophantidae
- Genus: Ariophanta
- Species: A. laevipes

Binomial name
- Ariophanta laevipes Müller, 1774

= Ariophanta laevipes =

Species of gastropod

Ariophanta laevipes is a species of air-breathing land snail, a terrestrial pulmonate gastropod mollusc in the family Ariophantidae.

Ariophanta laevipes is the type species of the genus Ariophanta.

== Shell description ==
The shell of this species is left-handed (sinistral).

The shell is depressed, rather thin, obliquely striated and decussated with fine spiral lines above, smooth beneath. The shell color is white or whitish with three spiral chestnut bands. The spire is low and conoidal, with 5 slightly convex whorls. The body whorl is rounded beneath but angulate at the periphery, the angulation generally disappearing near the mouth.

The aperture is lunate and diagonal. The peristome is in one plane, simple above, slightly thickened and reflected below.

The width of the shell is 23–28 mm. The height is 15 mm. There is a large flat variety.

The commonest variety is white with three spiral bands one near the suture, one above and one beneath the periphery. But some shells have the ground-colour brownish with darker bands, and some are white or dark brown throughout. The parietal wall of the aperture and the area around the umbilicus are never darker than the adjacent portion of the last whorl.

== Anatomy ==
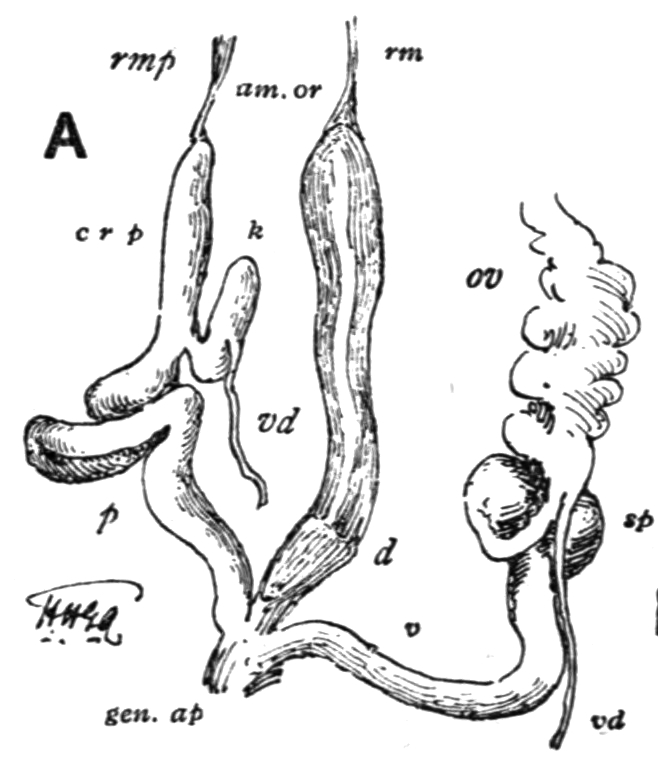
Reproductive system of Ariophanta laevipes containing love dart (d).

The reproductive system of Ariophanta laevipes includes a love dart.

The teeth on the radula have the formula 120 . 2 . 8 . 1 . 8 . 2 . 120 (130 . 1 . 130). The rhachidian tooth is tricuspid. The eight inner laterals are bicuspid and broad, forming a narrower median line than in other species of the genus, i.e. 17 teeth to 45 in the latter. The admedian teeth are bicuspid up to the 104th.

== Distribution ==
This species lives in India. In Bombay it is common in gardens. It also occurs in the Ilajpipla Hills, east of Surat.

== Life cycle ==
The egg of Ariophanta laevipes is elliptical, longitudinally sulcated, enclosed in a tough membrane, and 4 to 5 mm in length, 4-4.5 in diameter.
