= Caudal mucous pit =

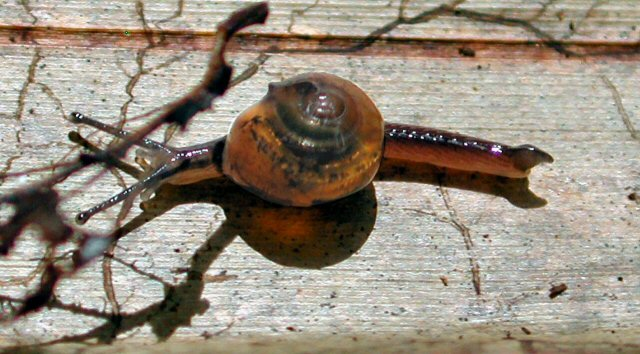
Ovachlamys fulgens (family Helicarionidae) with caudal horn on the tail end of the foot.

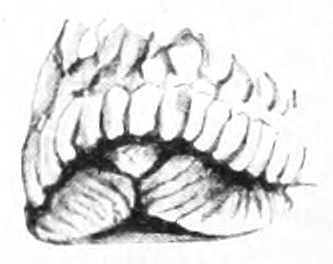
Drawing of the tail end of the body of Geomalacus maculosus showing supra-pedal grooves and triangular caudal mucous pit.

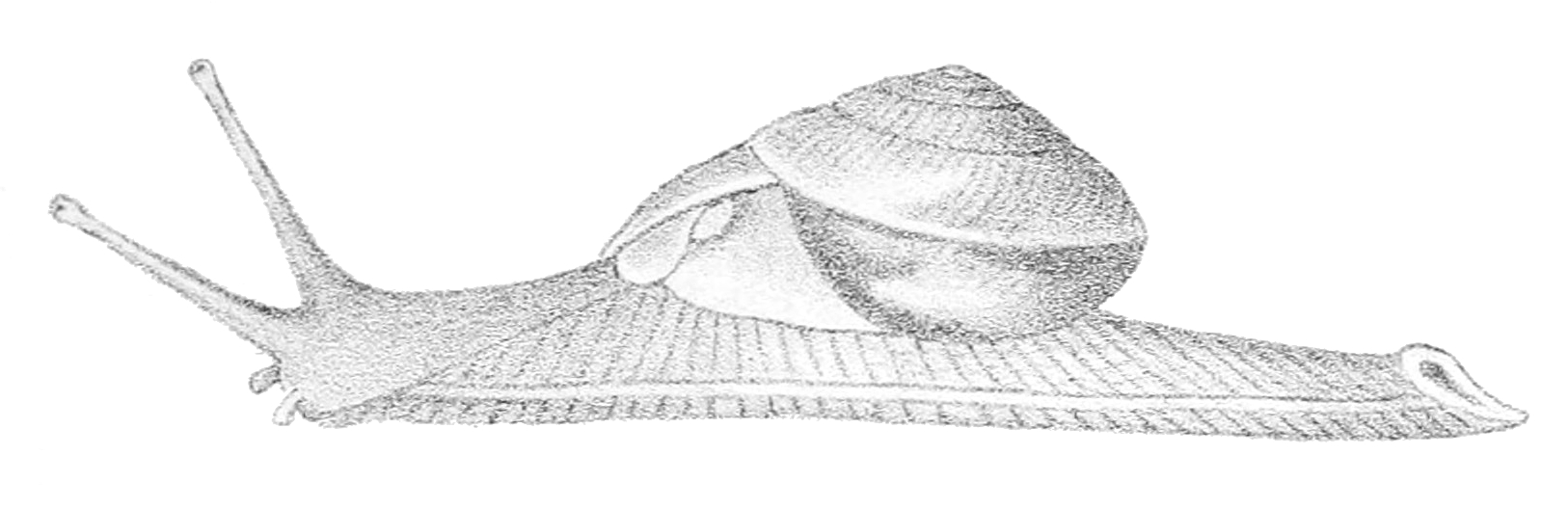
Drawing of Ariophanta interrupta shows the large caudal mucous pit on its tail end.

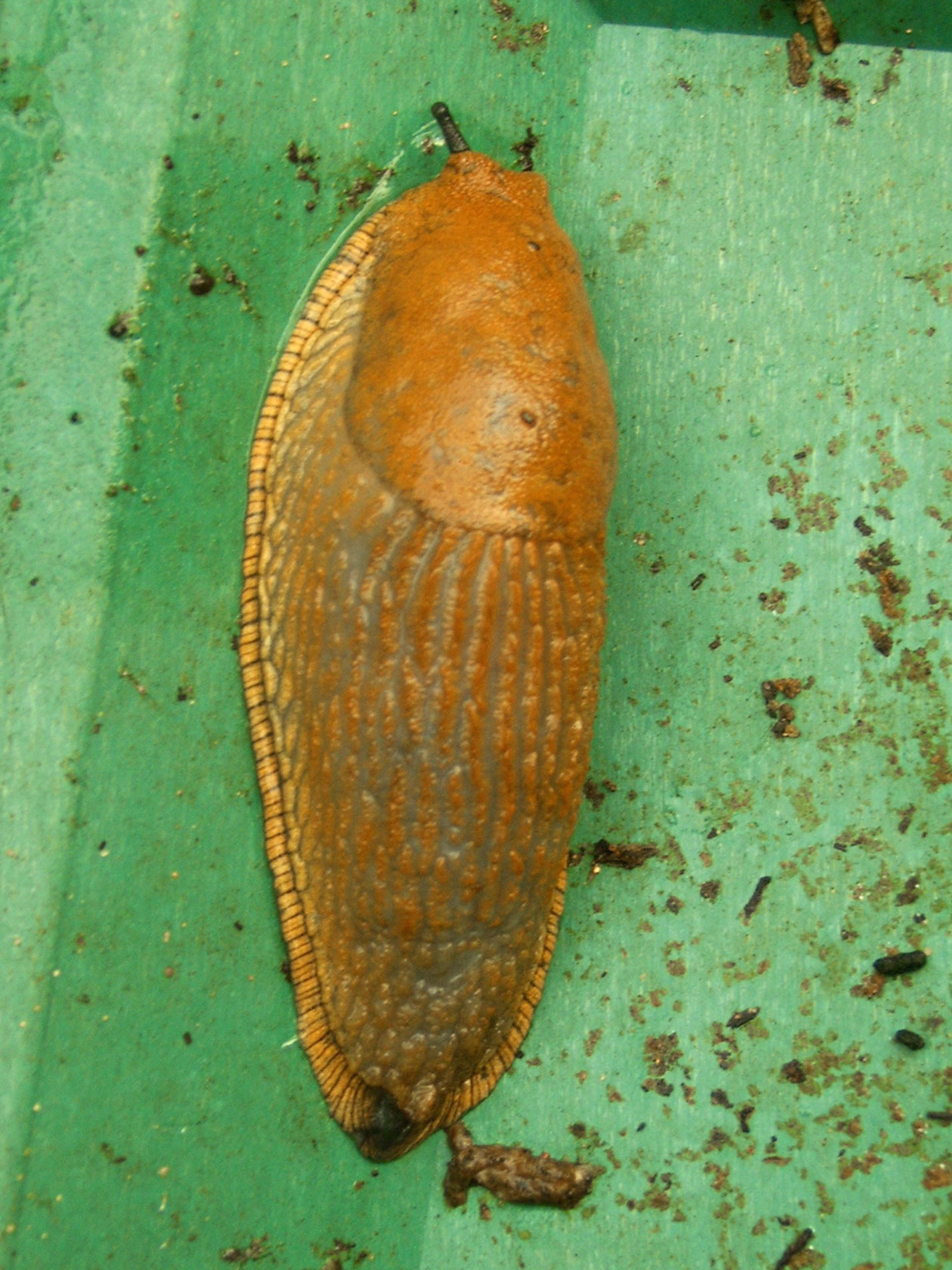
Dorsal view of Arion vulgaris shows caudal mucous pit on its tail end.

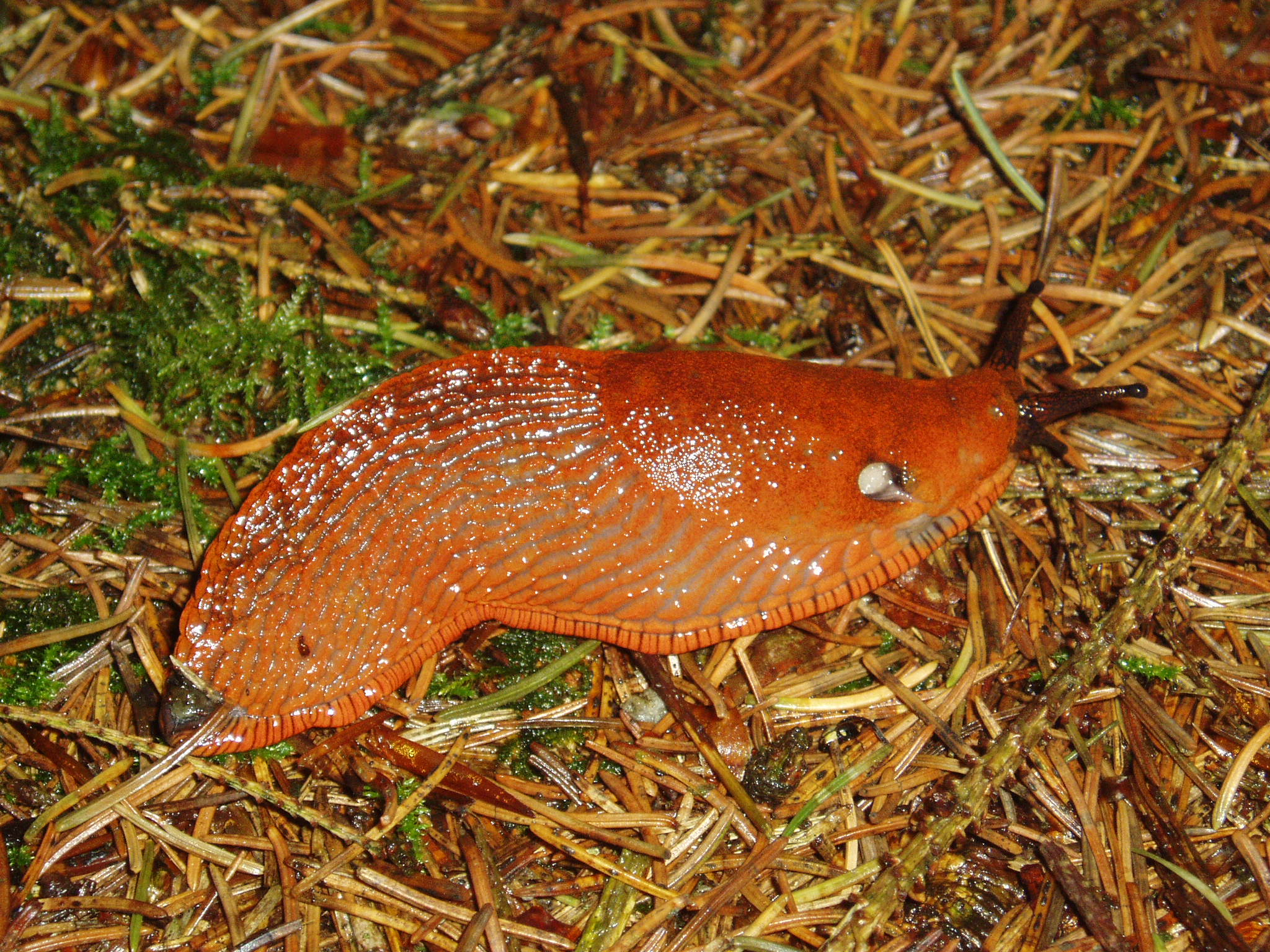
Arion rufus shows caudal mucous pit on its tail end.

The caudal mucous pit, or caudal mucous horn, is an anatomical structure on the tail end of the foot of various land snails and slugs, terrestrial pulmonate gastropod mollusks.

The function of this pit is the resorption of mucus when the gastropod is moving (see also Muratov 1999).

An incorrect and yet often-used term for this structure is the "caudal gland". This area also used to be referred to by the term "caudal pore".

== Families ==
Families of snails and slug where a caudal mucous pit exists in every species included:

- Arionidae:
- Endodontidae
- Polygyridae
- Helicodiscidae
- Daudebardiinae (a subfamily of Oxychilidae)
- Urocyclidae
- Helicarionidae
- Ariophantidae
- Systrophiidae (Systrophiidae is a synonym for Scolodontinae, the subfamily of family Scolodontidae)
- Dyakiidae

Families/subfamilies where is caudal mucous pit exists only on some species included:

- Ariopeltinae (a subfamily of Oopeltidae)
- Charopidae
- Binneyidae
- Ariolimacinae (a subfamily of Ariolimacidae)
- Anadenidae
- Trochomorphidae
- Helminthoglyptidae
- Ferussaciidae
- Subulinidae
- Euconulidae
- Zonitidae
- Vitreinae (Vitreinae is a synonym for Pristilomatidae)
- Gastrodontidae
