= List of non-marine molluscs of Mongolia =

The non-marine molluscs of Mongolia are a part of the fauna of Mongolia. They include land and freshwater gastropods and freshwater bivalves.

== Freshwater gastropods ==
Valvatidae

- Valvata antiqua Morris, 1838
- Valvata brevicula Kozhov, 1936
- Valvata confusa Westerlund, 1897
- Valvata piscinalis (O. F. Müller, 1774)
- Valvata sibirica Middendorff, 1851

Lymnaeidae

- Galba sibirica (Westerlund, 1885)
- Ladislavella terebra (Westerlund, 1885)
- Lymnaea stagnalis (Linnaeus, 1758)
- Orientogalba hookeri (Reeve, 1850)
- Orientogalba viridis (Quoy et Gaimard, 1833)
- Radix auricularia (Linnaeus, 1758)
- Radix bactriana (Hutton, 1849)
- Radix balthica (Linnaeus, 1758)
- Radix intermedia (Lamarck, 1822)
- Radix lagotis (Schrank, 1803)
- Radix mongolica (Yen, 1939)
- Radix obliquata (Martens, 1864)
- Radix parapsilia Vinarski et Glöer, 2009
- Radix tumida (Held, 1836)
- Radix zazurnensis (Mozley, 1934)

Physidae

- Physa fontinalis (Linnaeus, 1758)
- Physa taslei Bourguignat, 1860
- Sibirenauta tuwaensis Starobogatov et Zatravkin in Starobogatov, Prozorova et Zatravkin, 1989

Planorbidae

- Armiger annandalei (Germain, 1918)
- Armiger crista (Linnaeus, 1758)
- Bathyomphalus contortus (Linnaeus, 1758)
- Choanomphalus mongolicus Kozhov, 1946
- Gyraulus chinensis (Dunker, 1848)
- Gyraulus infraliratus (Westerlund, 1876)
- Gyraulus kruglowiae (Johansen, 1937)
- Gyraulus sibiricus (Dunker, 1848)
- Gyraulus stroemi (Westerlund, 1881)
- Gyraulus terekholicus (Prozorova et Starobogatov, 1997)
- Helicorbis kozhovi Starobogatov et Streletzkaja, 1967
- Polypylis sibirica Starobogatov et Streletzkaja, 1967

== See also ==
- List of non-marine molluscs of Russia
- List of non-marine molluscs of China
