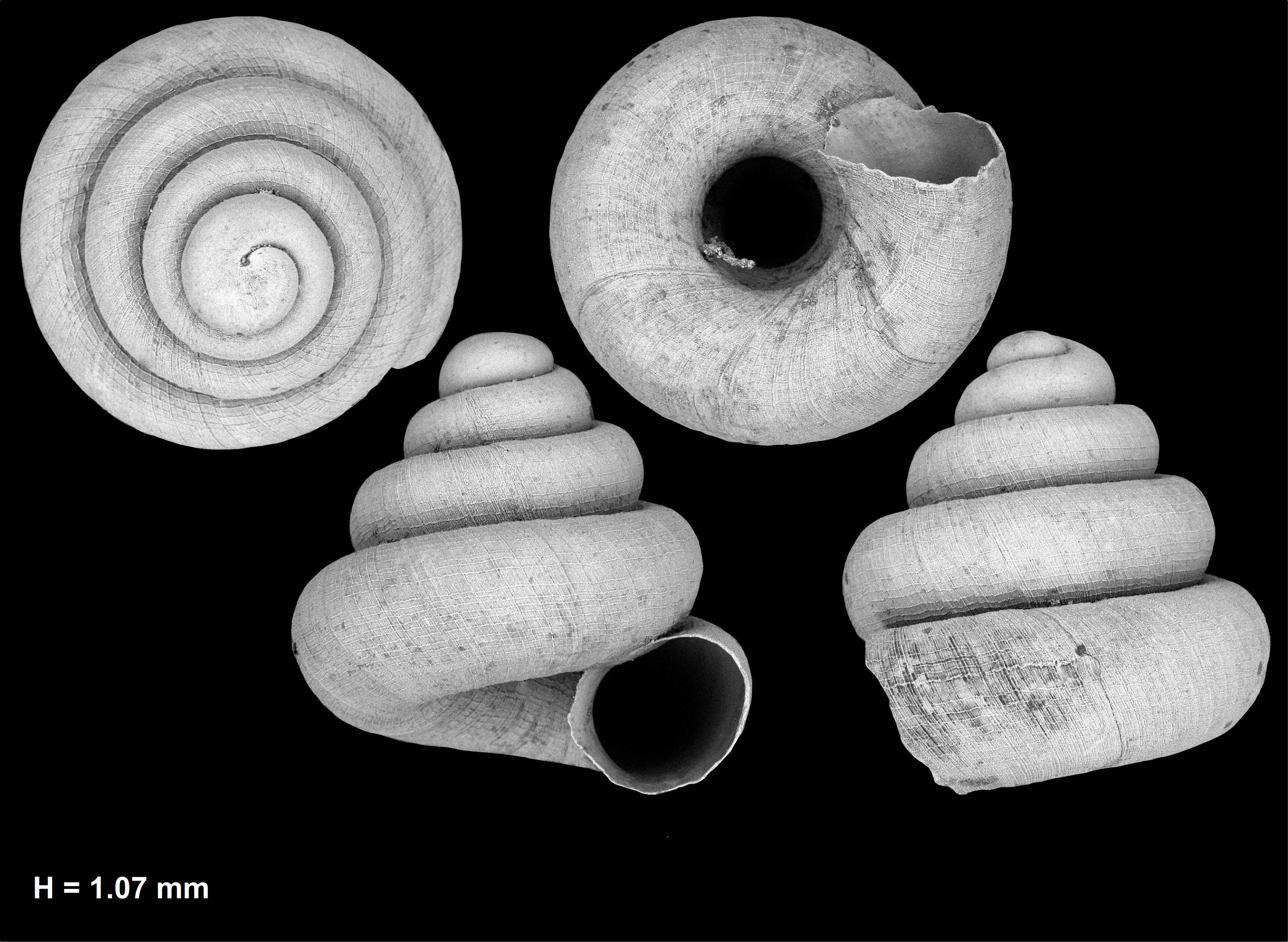
- Shell of Clostophis infantilis (holotype at MNHN, Paris)

Scientific classification
- Kingdom: Animalia
- Phylum: Mollusca
- Class: Gastropoda
- Order: Stylommatophora
- Infraorder: Pupilloidei
- Superfamily: Pupilloidea
- Family: Hypselostomatidae
- Genus: Clostophis; Benson, 1860

Type species
- Clostophis sankeyi Benson, 1860

Synonyms
- Montapiculus Panha & J. B. Burch, 1999 (junior synonym)

= Clostophis =

Genus of gastropods

Clostophis is a genus of air-breathing land snails, terrestrial pulmonate gastropod mollusks in the family Hypselostomatidae.

== Species ==
- Clostophis bactrianus Páll-Gergely & Hunyadi, 2022
- Clostophis candidus Páll-Gergely & Hunyadi, 2022
- Clostophis charybdis Páll-Gergely & Hunyadi, 2022
- Clostophis incurvus Páll-Gergely & Vermeulen, 2020
- Clostophis infantilis Páll-Gergely, 2020
- Clostophis koilobasis Páll-Gergely & Vermeulen, 2020
- Clostophis lacrima (Páll-Gergely & Hunyadi, 2015)
- Clostophis laidlawi (Collinge, 1902)
- Clostophis multiformis Páll-Gergely & A. Reischütz, 2020
- Clostophis neglectus (van Benthem Jutting, 1961)
- Clostophis obliquus Páll-Gergely & Hunyadi, 2022
- Clostophis obtusus Páll-Gergely & Grego, 2020
- Clostophis platytrochus Páll-Gergely & Hunyadi, 2020
- Clostophis proboscideus (Panha & J. B. Burch, 1999)
- Clostophis rhynchotes Tongkerd & Panha, 2025
- Clostophis sankeyi Benson, 1860
- Clostophis socialis (Páll-Gergely & Hunyadi, 2015)
- Clostophis stochi (Páll-Gergely & Jochum, 2017)
- Clostophis thinbowguensis Páll-Gergely & Hunyadi, 2022
- Clostophis udayaditinus Sutcharit & Panha, 2025
- Clostophis yoga Páll-Gergely & Hunyadi, 2022
