= Tricula montana =

Conservation status
- Least Concern (IUCN 3.1)

Scientific classification
- Kingdom: Animalia
- Phylum: Mollusca
- Class: Gastropoda
- Subclass: Caenogastropoda
- Order: Littorinimorpha
- Family: Pomatiopsidae
- Genus: Tricula
- Species: T. montana

Binomial name
- Tricula montana Benson, 1843

Species of gastropod

Tricula montana is a species of freshwater snail with a gill and an operculum, an aquatic gastropod mollusk in the family Pomatiopsidae.

Tricula montana is the type species of the genus Tricula.

== Distribution ==
The distribution of Tricula montana includes Assam, Uttarakhand in India, and Nepal.

== Ecology ==
This freshwater snail lives in springs, streams and small rivers.
