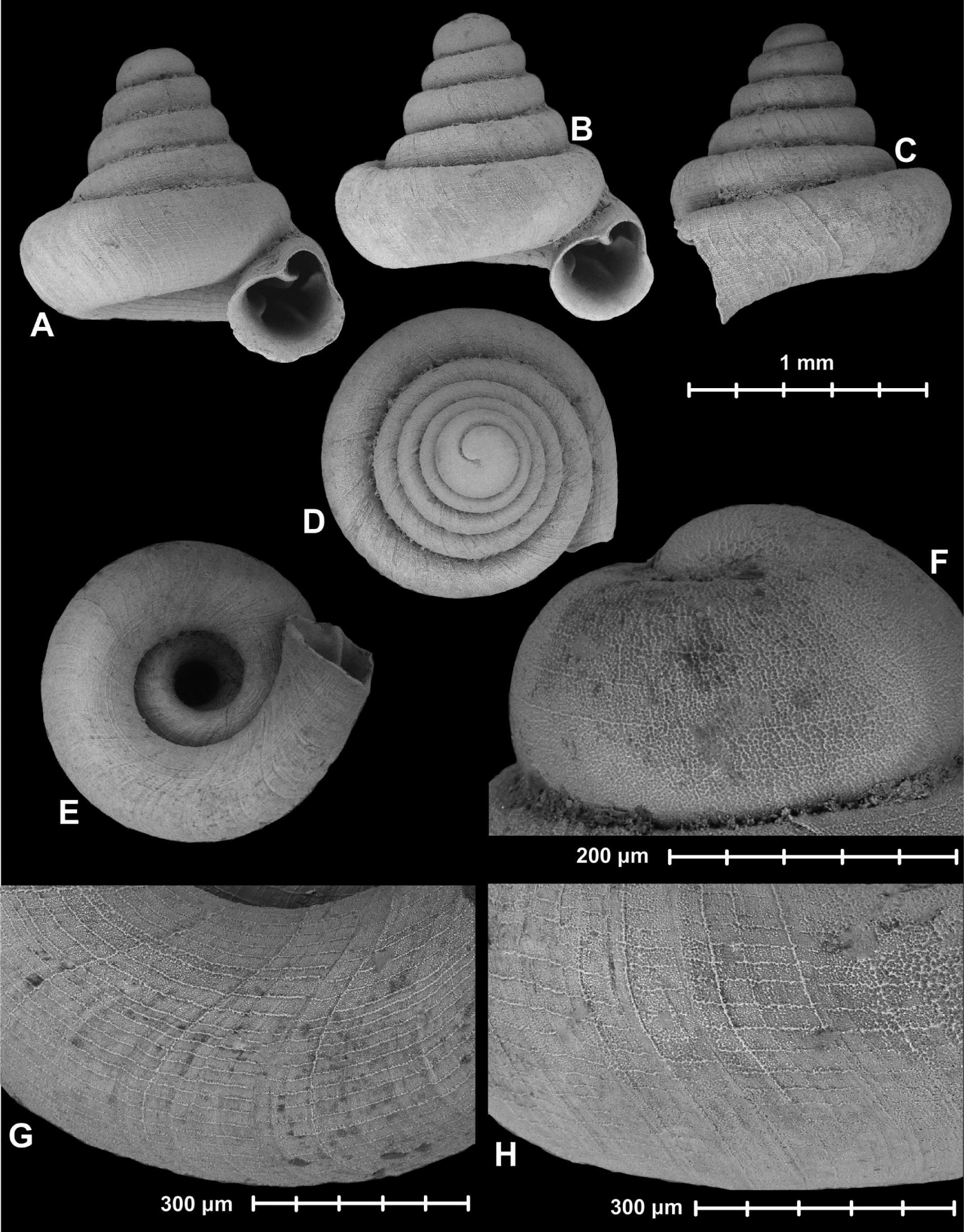

Scientific classification
- Kingdom: Animalia
- Phylum: Mollusca
- Class: Gastropoda
- Order: Stylommatophora
- Family: Hypselostomatidae
- Genus: Clostophis
- Species: C. lacrima

Binomial name
- Clostophis lacrima (Páll-Gergely & Hunyadi, 2015)

= Clostophis lacrima =

Species of gastropod

Clostophis lacrima is a species of small pulmonate gastropod of the family Hypselostomatidae endemic to limestone precipices in Guangxi, China.

== Distribution ==
C. lacrima has been recorded only from the type locality in litter at 22°29.161'N, 106°57.357'E at an elevation of 220 m on the base of limestone cliffs north of Lenglei (楞垒) and the Nonggang Nature Reserve (弄岗国家级自然保护区), Longzhou Xian (龙州县), Chongzuo Shi (崇左市), Guangxi (广西), China.

== Ecology, conservation and evolution ==
C. lacrima was collected in soil samples at the base of limestone cliffs alongside specimens of Angustopila fabella, and most likely occurs in sympatry with this species on the exposed cliff-faces of Lenglei as has been observed with other hypselostomatids. Many of the recently discovered hypselostomatids of this region have been classified by the authors as being Critically Endangered under IUCN criteria, being restricted (by collection, or nature) to single sites and falling at risk to limestone quarries. Multiple hypotheses of the biogeographical origins of such hypselostomatids have been supported by the authors: firstly, the isolation of populations may be a misconception, and be product of contiguous means of dispersal (cave systems or river drainages) of which only limited components have been studied; secondly, the distributions may be created by rare long-distance dispersal events; or thirdly, that the similarities between allopatric species are the result of convergent evolution. No evidence has thus far been discovered that may reject or prefer one of the three models.

== Etymology ==
The name lacrima (from the Latin for teardrop) is in reference to the tear-shaped aperture, characteristic of this species.
