= Fauna of Bhutan =

Native animals of Bhutan

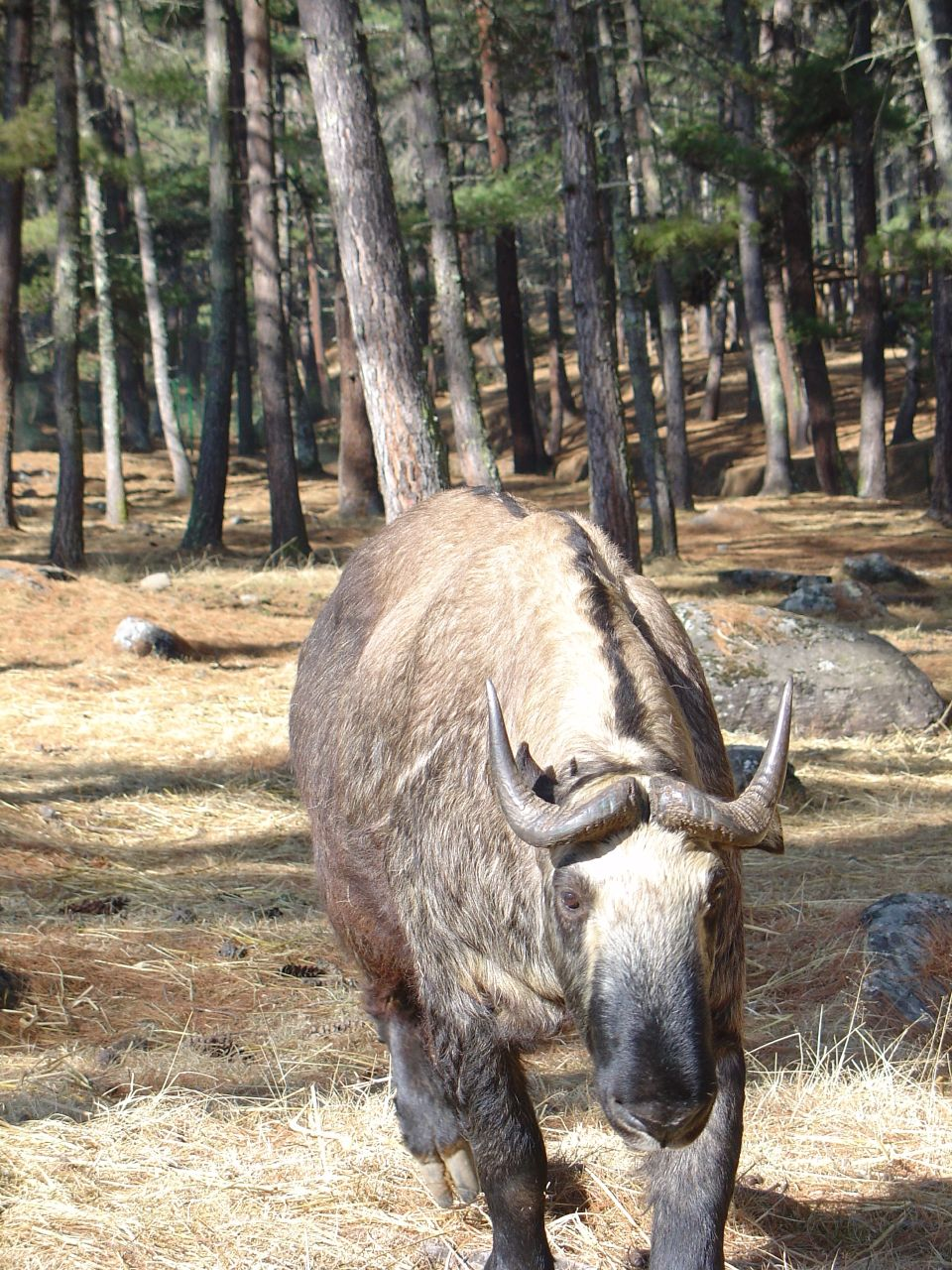
National symbol of Bhutan, the takin

The fauna of Bhutan refers to the animal species that live in Bhutan. Because of its unique geographical location and relatively well preserved natural environment, the fauna of Bhutan is the richest among Asian countries of comparable dimensions. There are an estimate of more than 160 mammal species.

In a narrow tropical and subtropical zone, located along the southern border of the Himalayas, the mammals include Asian elephant, Indian rhinoceros, gaur, Asian buffalo, hog deer, clouded leopard, binturong, barasingha, pygmy hog, bristly rabbit, endemic golden langur and the sloth bear and birds - hornbills and trogons. In these forests there are snakes, mosquitoes and many other insects.
