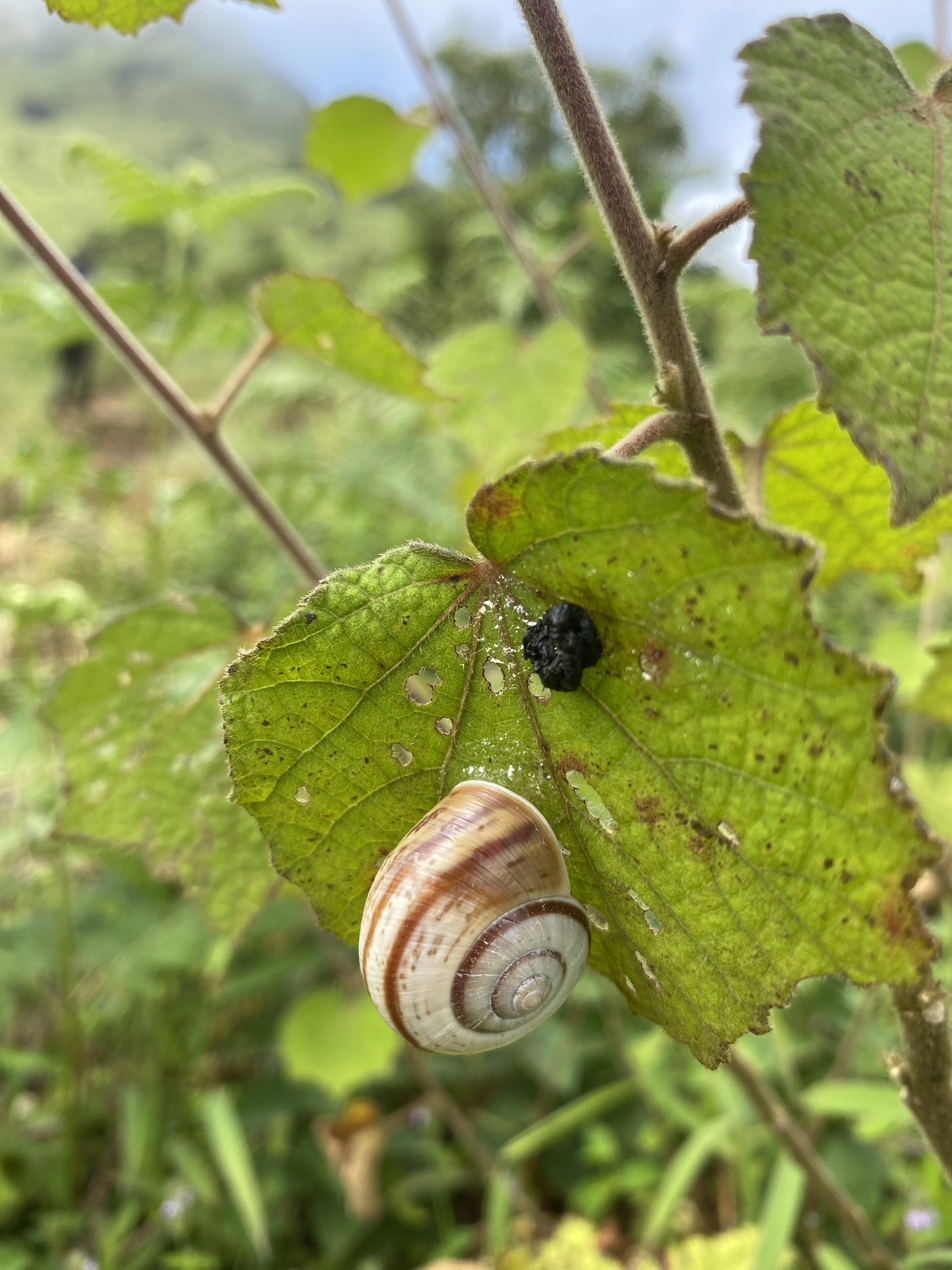
- Ariophanta bistrialis

Scientific classification
- Kingdom: Animalia
- Phylum: Mollusca
- Class: Gastropoda
- Order: Stylommatophora
- Infraorder: Limacoidei
- Superfamily: Helicarionoidea
- Family: Ariophantidae
- Genus: Ariophanta; Des Moulins, 1829

Species
- See text

Synonyms
- Ariophanta (Ariophanta) Des Moulins, 1829· accepted, alternate representation; Ariophanta (Celectella) Schileyko, 2002· accepted, alternate representation; Euplectella Jousseaume, 1894; Helix (Ariophanta) Des Moulins, 1829 (original rank); Nanina (Ariophanta) Des Moulins, 1829

= Ariophanta =

Genus of gastropods

Ariophanta is a genus of terrestrial gastropods in the subfamily Ariophantinae of the family Ariophantidae.

The shell is sinistral or left-handed in its coiling.

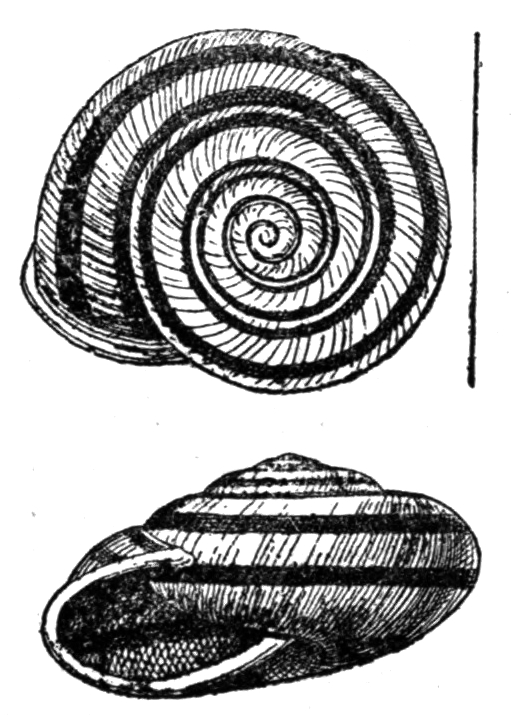
A shell of Ariophanta laevipes.

== Species ==
Ariophanta laevipes is the type species of the genus Ariophanta.

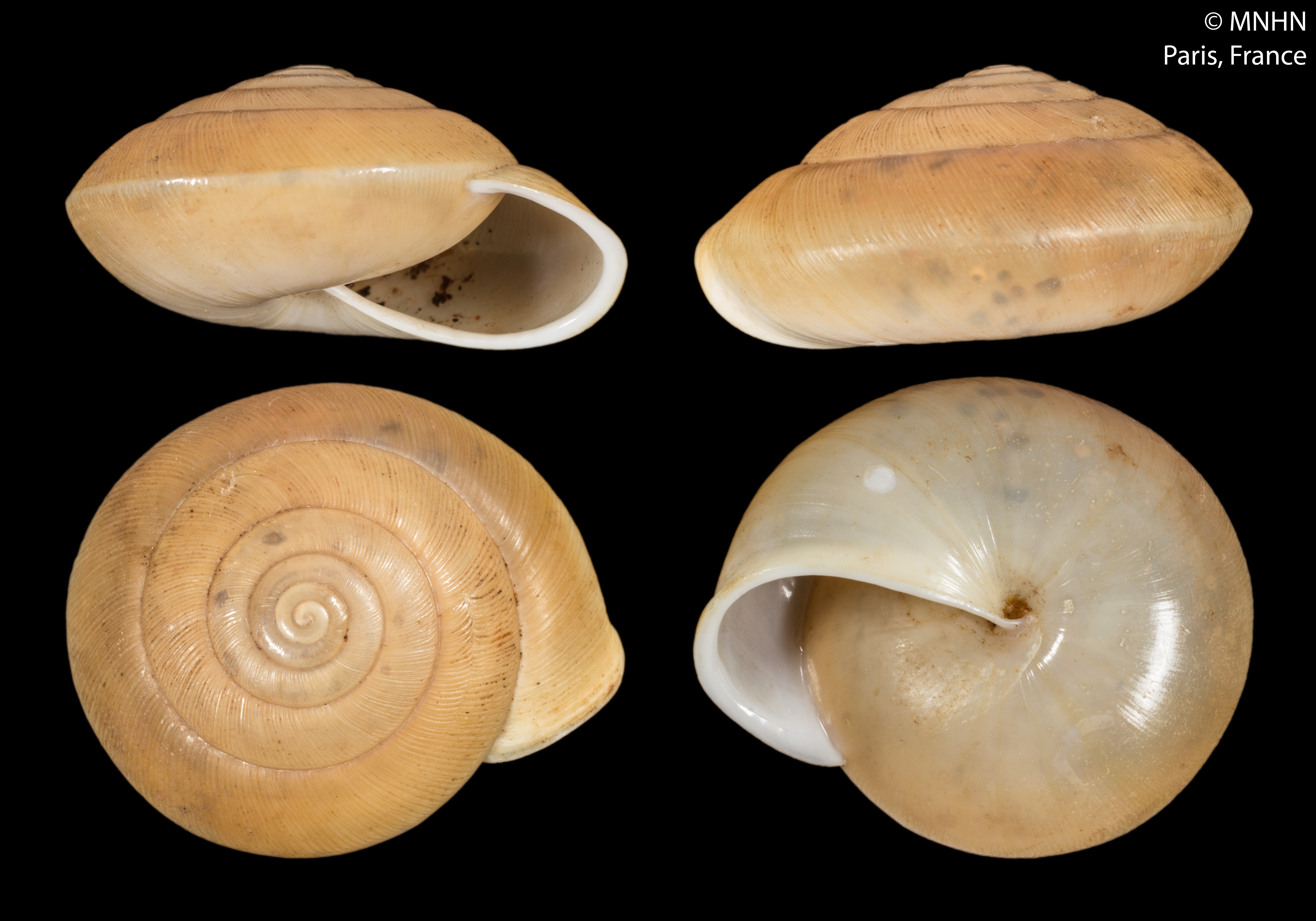
Ariophanta weinkauffiana (Crosse & P. Fischer, 1863) (syntype at MNHN, Paris)

Species in the genus Ariophanta include:

- Ariophanta albata (W. T. Blanford, 1880)
- Ariophanta ammonia (Deshayes, 1850)
- Ariophanta basilessa (Benson, 1865)
- Ariophanta basileus (Benson, 1861)
- Ariophanta beddomei (W. T. Blanford, 1874)
- Ariophanta belangeri (Deshayes, 1832)
- Ariophanta bistrialis (H. Beck, 1837)
- Ariophanta bombayana (Grateloup, 1840)
- Ariophanta canarica W. T. Blanford, 1901
- Ariophanta crossei (L. Pfeiffer, 1862)
- Ariophanta cysis (Benson, 1852)
- Ariophanta danae (L. Pfeiffer, 1863)
- Ariophanta gassii W. T. Blanford, 1901
- Ariophanta himalana (I. Lea, 1834)
- Ariophanta immerita (W. T. Blanford, 1870)
- Ariophanta innata Fulton, 1905
- Ariophanta intumescens (W. T. Blanford, 1866)
- Ariophanta kadapaensis (Nevill, 1878)
- Ariophanta laevipes (O. F. Müller, 1774)
- Ariophanta laidlayana (Benson, 1856)
- Ariophanta maderaspatana (Gray, 1834)
- Ariophanta prionotropis (Möllendorff, 1898)
- Ariophanta promiscua (E. A. Smith, 1893)
- Ariophanta semirugata (Beck, 1837)
- Ariophanta sisparica (W. T. Blanford, 1866)
- Ariophanta solata (Benson, 1848)
- Ariophanta thyreus (Benson, 1852)
- Ariophanta tongkingensis (Möllendorff, 1902)
- Ariophanta trangensis Thach & F. Huber, 2020

Taxa inquirenda:

- Ariophanta duplocincta Möllendorff, 1897
- Ariophanta huberi Thach, 2018 (debated synonym)
- Ariophanta trifasciata (Chemnitz)

== Distribution ==
This genus is endemic to India.
