= Ennea (gastropod) =

Scientific classification
- Kingdom: Animalia
- Phylum: Mollusca
- Class: Gastropoda
- Order: Stylommatophora
- Family: Streptaxidae
- Subfamily: Enneinae
- Genus: Ennea; H. Adams & A. Adams, 1855

Type species
- Pupa elegantula L. Pfeiffer, 1846

Synonyms
- Carychiopsis E. von Martens, 1895; Ennea (Carychiopsis) E. von Martens, 1895; Ennea (Enneastrum) L. Pfeiffer, 1856; Enneastrum L. Pfeiffer, 1856; Pupa (Ennea) H. Adams & A. Adams, 1855 (original rank)

Genus of gastropods

Ennea is a genus of air-breathing land snails, terrestrial pulmonate gastropod mollusks in the family Streptaxidae.

Ennea is the type genus of the subfamily Enneinae.

This genus has become a synonym of Ptychotrema L. Pfeiffer, 1853

== Distribution ==
The distribution of the genus Ennea is Afrotropical and includes:

== Species ==
Species within the genus Ennea include:

- Ennea arthuri Preston, 1913: synonym of Gulella odhneriana Dupuis, 1923
- Ennea cylindracea E.A. Smith, 1897 (taxon inquirendum)

Species brought into synonymy:

- Ennea aliena Bavay & Dautzenberg, 1912: synonym of Indoennea aliena (Bavay & Dautzenberg, 1912) accepted as Sinoennea aliena (Bavay & Dautzenberg, 1912) (original combination)
