= William Henry Benson =

Civil servant in British India and mollusc collector

- Born: 30 March 1803; St Helier, Jersey
- Died: 27 January 1870 (aged 66); Cheltenham, United Kingdom
- Citizenship: British
- Education: East India College
- Scientific career
- Fields: Malacology
- Workplaces: East India Company

William Henry Benson (30 March 1803 – 27 January 1870) was a civil servant in British India and a pioneer malacologist. He made large collections of molluscs and described over 470 species, mainly from India, Sri Lanka, Burma and South Africa.

Benson studied at Haileybury College, Hertfordshire, which was then the training college for the East India Company's civil service. After graduating, he arrived in Calcutta on 30 October 1821 to begin a career that included positions as a District Collector and Officiating Judge in Meerut, Bareilly and other parts of northern India. During his stay in India he collected specimens of numerous land snails some of which he sent to Hugh Cuming in England.

On the return from a trip to Mauritius he brought a couple of living Achatina fulica which he gave to a friend in Calcutta in April 1847 who subsequently released them in a garden at Chowringhee. The species is today a pest in many parts of India.

His son-in-law Major Richard Sankey was executor of his estate. Benson's collection of shells was briefly in the possession of Sylvanus Hanley, who removed many of the detailed labels thus decreasing their scientific value. The collection was then purchased by Robert MacAndrew, who in turn bequeathed it to the University Museum of Zoology, Cambridge, in 1873.

== Bibliography ==
A partial list of publications by Benson includes:

- Benson, W. H. (February 1832). "Conchological notes, chiefly relating to the land and freshwater shells of the Doab and the Gangetic Provinces of Hindostan". Journal of the Asiatic Society of Bengal. 1 (2): 75–77.
- Benson, W. H. (November 1836). "Descriptive catalogue of a collection of land and fresh-water shells, chiefly contained in the Museum of the Asiatic Society". Journal of the Asiatic Society of Bengal. 5 (59): 741–750.
- Benson, W. H. (1851). "Geographical notices and characters of fourteen new species of Cyclostomacea from the East Indies". Annals and Magazine of Natural History. 2nd Series. 8 (45): 184–195. doi:10.1080/03745486109496203.
- Benson, W. H. (1852). "Notes on the genus Cyclostoma and characters of new species from India, Borneo and Natal". Annals and Magazine of Natural History. 2nd Series. 8 (58): 268–272.
- Benson, W. H. (1854). "Characters of four Indian species of Cyclophorus Montfort, Followed by notes on the geographical distribution of the genera of the Cyclostomacea with remarks in its affinities and notes on several opercula". Annals and Magazine of Natural History. 2nd Series. 14 (84): 411–418. doi:10.1080/037454809494367.
- Benson, W. H. (1857). "Characters of Streptaulus, a new genus and several species of the Cyclostomacea from Sikkim, the Khasi Hills, Ava, and Pegu". Annals and Magazine of Natural History. 2nd Series. 19 (111): 201–211. doi:10.1080/00222935708681840.
- Benson, W. H. (1858). "Note sur la transportation et la naturalization au Bengale de l'Achatina fulica de Lamarck". Journal de Conchyliologie (in French). 1: 336–339.
- Benson, W. H. (1859). "Description of new species of Helix, Streptaxis, Vitrina, collected by W. Theobald, jun., in Burmah, the Khasi Hills, and Hindustan". Annals and Magazine of Natural History. 3rd Series. 3 (15): 184–189.
- Benson, W. H. (1859). "New Helicidae collected by W. Theobald, Esq. Jun in Burmah and the Khasi Hills and characters of a new Burmese Streptaxis described by W. H. Benson, Esq". Annals and Magazine of Natural History. 3rd Series. 3 (17): 387–392.
- Benson, W. H. (1859). "Observations on the shell and animal of Hybocyctis, a new genus of Cyclostomidae based on Megalomastoma gravidum and Otopoma blenus with notes on other living shells from India and Burmah". Annals and Magazine of Natural History. 3rd Series. 4 (20): 90–93. doi:10.1080/00222935908697091.
- Benson, W. H. (1860). "Characters of new land shells from Burma and the Andamans". Annals and Magazine of Natural History. 3rd Series. 6 (33): 190–195. doi:10.1080/00222936008697305.
- Benson, W. H. (April 1860). "Notes on Plectopylis, a group a Helicidae distinguished by several internal plicate ephiphragms; with the characters of a new species". Annals and Magazine of Natural History. 3rd Series. 5 (28): 243–247. doi:10.1080/00222936008697212.
- Benson, W. H. (1863). "Characters of new land shells of the genus Helix, Clausilia, Spiraxis from Andamans, Moulmein, Northern India and Ceylon". Annals and Magazine of Natural History. 3rd Series. 11 (62): 87–91. doi:10.1080/00222936308681386.
- Benson, W. H. (1863). "Characters of new land shells from the Andamans island, Burma and Ceylon and of the animal of Sophina". Annals and Magazine of Natural History. 3rd Series. 11 (65): 318–323. doi:10.1080/00222936308681435.
- Benson, W. H. (1863). "Characters of new operculate land shells from the Andamans and of Indo Burmese species of Pupa". Annals and Magazine of Natural History. 3rd Series. 12 (72): 425–429. doi:10.1080/00222936308681554.
- Benson, W. H. (1864). "Characters of Coilostele an undescribed genus of Auriculacea and of species of Helix, Pupa and Ancylus from India, West Africa and Ceylon". Annals and Magazine of Natural History. 3rd Series. 13 (74): 136–140. doi:10.1080/00222936408681588.

== Taxa described by him ==
Genera:

- Pterocyclus (Benson, 1832)
- Oxygyrus (Benson, 1835)
- Batillaria (Benson in Cantor, 1842)
- Diplommatina (Benson, 1849)
- Streptaulus (Benson, 1857)
- Dioryx (Benson, 1859)
- Clostophis (Benson, 1860)
- Rhiostoma (Benson, 1860)

Species:

- Carinaria cithara (Benson, 1835)
- Carinaria galea (Benson, 1835)
- Musculista senhousia (Benson, 1842)
- Indrella ampulla (Benson, 1850)
