= Spiracle =

Spiracle or spiraculum may refer to:

- Spiracle (arthropods), opening in the exoskeletons of some arthropods
- Spiracle (vertebrates), openings on the surface of some vertebrates
- Spiraculum, a genus of land snails in family Cyclophoridae
