= Ditropis whitei =

Conservation status
- Vulnerable (IUCN 2.3)

Scientific classification
- Kingdom: Animalia
- Phylum: Mollusca
- Class: Gastropoda
- Subclass: Caenogastropoda
- Order: Architaenioglossa
- Family: Cyclophoridae
- Genus: Ditropopsis
- Species: D. whitei

Binomial name
- Ditropopsis whitei Brazier, 1874

Species of gastropod

Ditropis whitei is a species of land snails with opercula, terrestrial gastropods in the family Cyclophoridae. This species is endemic to Australia.
