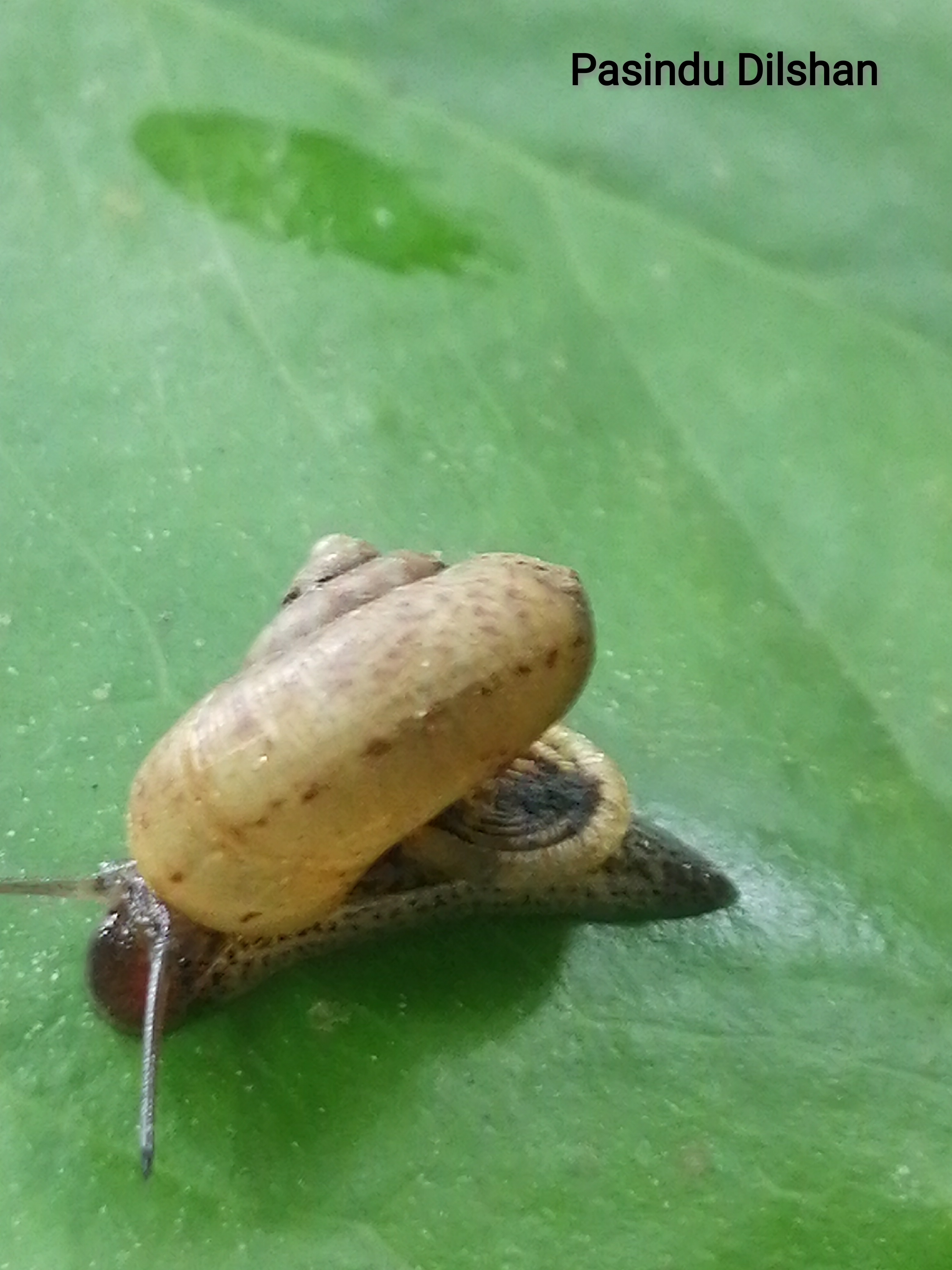
- Live specimen of Aulopoma helicinum

Scientific classification
- Kingdom: Animalia
- Phylum: Mollusca
- Class: Gastropoda
- Subclass: Caenogastropoda
- Order: Architaenioglossa
- Family: Cyclophoridae
- Genus: Aulopoma
- Species: A. helicinum

Binomial name
- Aulopoma helicinum (L. Pfeiffer, 1847)

Synonyms
- Cyclostoma helicinum L. Pfeiffer, 1847; Turbo helicinus Chemnitz, 1786 · unaccepted (non-binominal); Turbo helicoides Gmelin, 1791 (original combination)

= Aulopoma helicinum =

Species of gastropod

Aulopoma helicinum is a species of small land snail with an operculum, terrestrial pulmonate gastropod mollusc in the family Cyclophoridae.

== Distribution ==
It is endemic to Sri Lanka.

== Description ==
It is about 14mm in length.

(Description in German by Kobelt) Height 6.5 mm; diameter 13 × 10 mm.

The shell is widely umbilicate, almost disc-shaped, thin, and striated, pale horn-colored with brown marbling and a band. The apex is styliform, bluish-brown. There are four rounded whorls; the body whorl descends anteriorly and is detached. The aperture is oblique and almost circular; the lip is continuous, straight, thin, and sharp. The operculum is more tightly coiled than in Aulopoma itieri, with convex whorls that are densely folded on the exterior.
