= Japonia hispida =

Conservation status
- Data Deficient (IUCN 2.3)

Scientific classification
- Kingdom: Animalia
- Phylum: Mollusca
- Class: Gastropoda
- Subclass: Caenogastropoda
- Order: Architaenioglossa
- Family: Cyclophoridae
- Genus: Japonia
- Species: J. hispida

Binomial name
- Japonia hispida Minato, 1982

Species of gastropod

Japonia hispida is a species of land snail with opercula, terrestrial gastropods in the family Cyclophoridae. This species is endemic to Japan.
