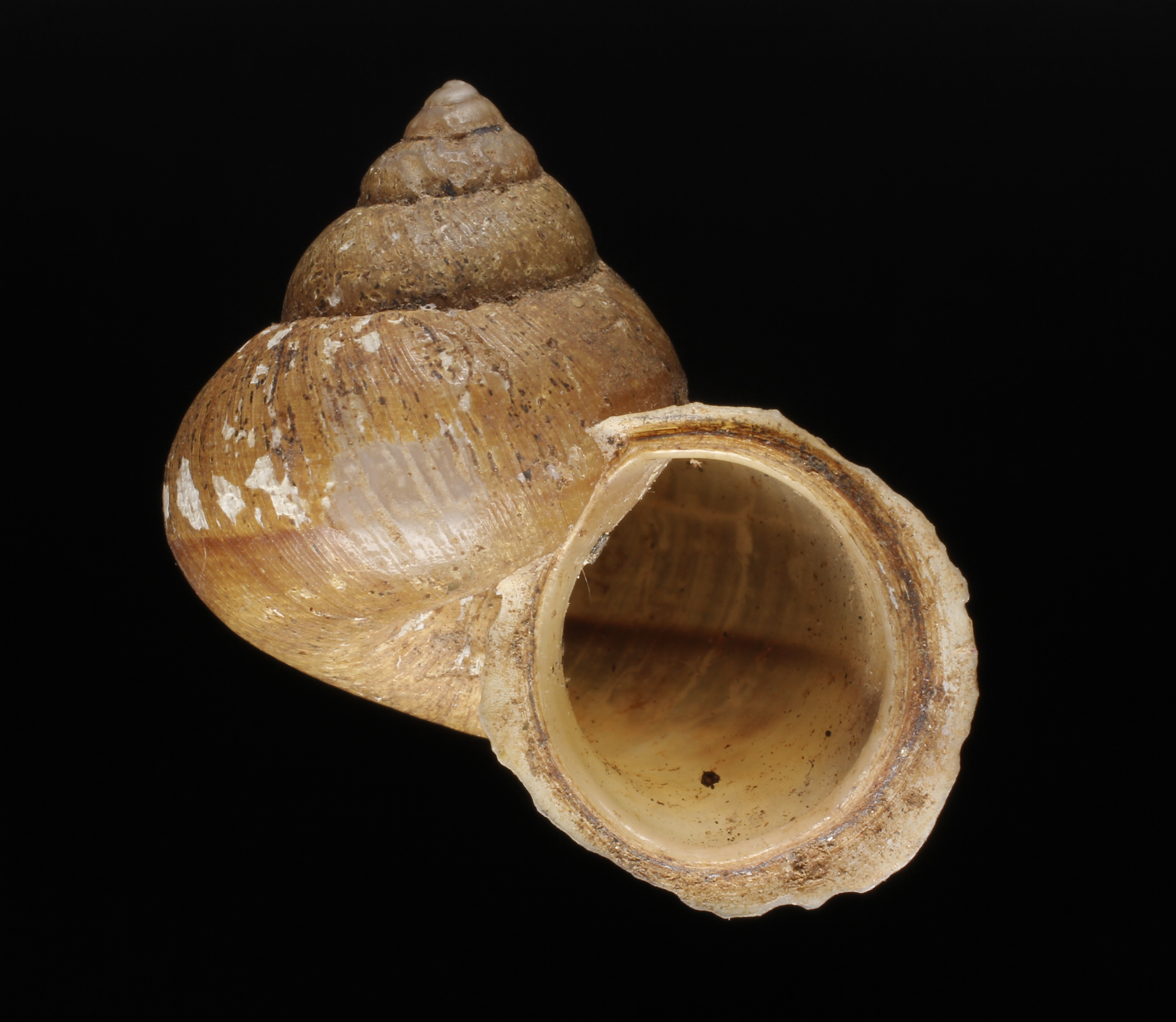
- Shell of Acroptychia aequivoca (syntype at MNHN, Paris)

Scientific classification
- Kingdom: Animalia
- Phylum: Mollusca
- Class: Gastropoda
- Subclass: Caenogastropoda
- Order: Architaenioglossa
- Family: Cyclophoridae
- Genus: Acroptychia
- Species: A. aequivoca

Binomial name
- Acroptychia aequivoca (L. Pfeiffer, 1857)

Synonyms
- Acroptychia manicata Crosse & P. Fischer, 1883 (junior synonym); Anceyiella aequivoca (L. Pfeiffer, 1857); Cyclostoma (Cyclophorus) aequivocum L. Pfeiffer, 1857 (basionym)

= Acroptychia aequivoca =

Species of gastropods

Acroptychia aequivoca is a species of land snails, gastropod mollusks in the family Cyclophoridae.

== Description ==
The shell of Acroptychia aequivoca is helicoid (coiled like a spiral) and features a wide umbilicus, which is the hollow space or cavity at the center of the shell's underside. The shell typically has 5.5 whorls (turns of the spiral) and is distinctively encircled by three faint, reddish-brown color bands. Its aperture (the main opening of the shell) is perfectly circular, showcasing a unique blood-red color on the inner lip and a rolled-back or reflected outer lip. The total length of the shell can vary from 10 to 30 millimeters in size.

== Habitat and Distribution ==
This species is endemic to Madagascar, meaning it is found nowhere else on Earth. Its range covers the southern, eastern, and northeastern regions of the island, including documented sightings in Ekongo. It primarily populates the humid eastern rainforests, where it spans a large altitude range that stretches all the way from the coastal sea level up into the central highlands.
