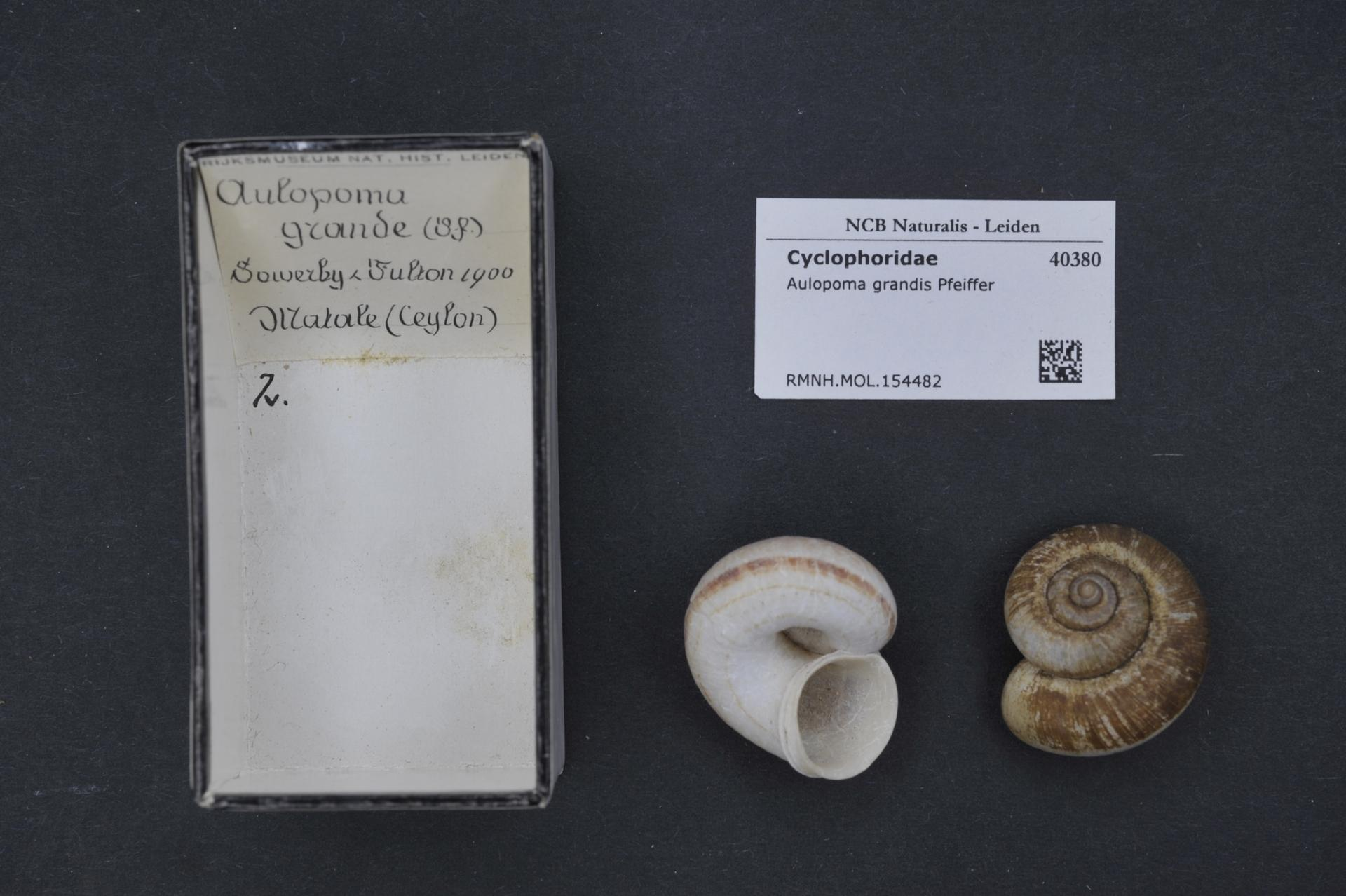
- Shell of Aulopoma grande (specimen at Naturalis Biodiversity Center)

Scientific classification
- Kingdom: Animalia
- Phylum: Mollusca
- Class: Gastropoda
- Subclass: Caenogastropoda
- Order: Architaenioglossa
- Family: Cyclophoridae
- Genus: Aulopoma
- Species: A. grande

Binomial name
- Aulopoma grande (Pfeiffer, 1855)

Synonyms
- Cyclostoma (Aulopoma) grande L. Pfeiffer, 1855 (original combination)

= Aulopoma grande =

Species of gastropod

Aulopoma grande is a species of small land snail with an operculum, terrestrial pulmonate gastropod mollusc in the family Cyclophoridae.

== Diqtribution ==
It is endemic to Sri Lanka.

== Description ==
It is about 21-27mm in length.

Height of the shell is 13 mm; diameter 25 × 21.5 mm; aperture width 11 mm.

(Description German by Kobelt) The shell is umbilicate, depressed, thick-walled, compact, and distinctly striated, with a few broad spiral grooves and faint marbling. The periostracum is blackish-brown, often worn away in streaks. There are five convex whorls; the body whorl is rounded at the periphery, smoother on the underside, briefly detached at the front, and scarcely descending. The aperture is oblique and fairly circular; the lip is simple and straight. The operculum has six whorls with strongly oblique folds.
