= Nobuea kurodai =

Conservation status
- Data Deficient (IUCN 2.3)

Scientific classification
- Kingdom: Animalia
- Phylum: Mollusca
- Class: Gastropoda
- Subclass: Caenogastropoda
- Order: Architaenioglossa
- Family: Cyclophoridae
- Genus: Nobuea
- Species: N. kurodai

Binomial name
- Nobuea kurodai Minato & Tada, 1978

Species of gastropod

Nobuea kurodai is a species of tropical land snail with an operculum, a terrestrial gastropod mollusk in the family Cyclophoridae. This species is endemic to Japan.
