= Japonia striatula =

Conservation status
- Data Deficient (IUCN 2.3)

Scientific classification
- Kingdom: Animalia
- Phylum: Mollusca
- Class: Gastropoda
- Subclass: Caenogastropoda
- Order: Architaenioglossa
- Family: Cyclophoridae
- Genus: Japonia
- Species: J. striatula

Binomial name
- Japonia striatula Kuroda, 1973

Species of gastropod

Japonia striatula is a species of land snail first described in 1973, an operculate terrestrial gastropod in the family Cyclophoridae and endemic to Japan.
