= Aulopoma sphaeroideum =

Scientific classification
- Kingdom: Animalia
- Phylum: Mollusca
- Class: Gastropoda
- Subclass: Caenogastropoda
- Order: Architaenioglossa
- Family: Cyclophoridae
- Genus: Aulopoma
- Species: A. sphaeroideum

Binomial name
- Aulopoma sphaeroideum Dohrn, 1847

Species of gastropod

Aulopoma sphaeroideum is a species of small land snail with an operculum, terrestrial pulmonate gastropod mollusc in the family Cyclophoridae.

== Distribution ==
It is endemic to Sri Lanka.

== Description ==
It is about 19mm in length.

(Description in German by Kobelt) The height of the shell attains 9 mm, its diameter 13.5 : 11.25 mm

The shell is narrowly umbilicate, globose-conic, thin, and striated; it is white with indistinct red marbling. The periostracum is brownish. The apex is rather pointed and blackish. There are nearly 4 very rapidly increasing whorls, the bottom two of which are inflated, with the body whorl being briefly detached at the front. The aperture is oblique and circular, slightly angular at the top; the peristome is simple and straight. The operculum is pale, externally hollowed in the center, and consists of 5 convex, obliquely striated whorls.
