= Caspicyclotus =

Scientific classification
- Domain: Eukaryota
- Kingdom: Animalia
- Phylum: Mollusca
- Class: Gastropoda
- Subclass: Caenogastropoda
- Order: Architaenioglossa
- Superfamily: Cyclophoroidea
- Family: Cyclophoridae
- Genus: Caspicyclotus; Forcart, 1935

Genus of land snails

Caspicyclotus is a genus of gastropods belonging to the family Cyclophoridae.

The species of this genus are found in Western Asia.

Species:

- Caspicyclotus akramowskii Schütt, 1997
- Caspicyclotus armenicus Schütt, 1991
- Caspicyclotus belchatoviensis Stworzewicz, 1995
- Caspicyclotus sieversi (L.Pfeiffer, 1871)
