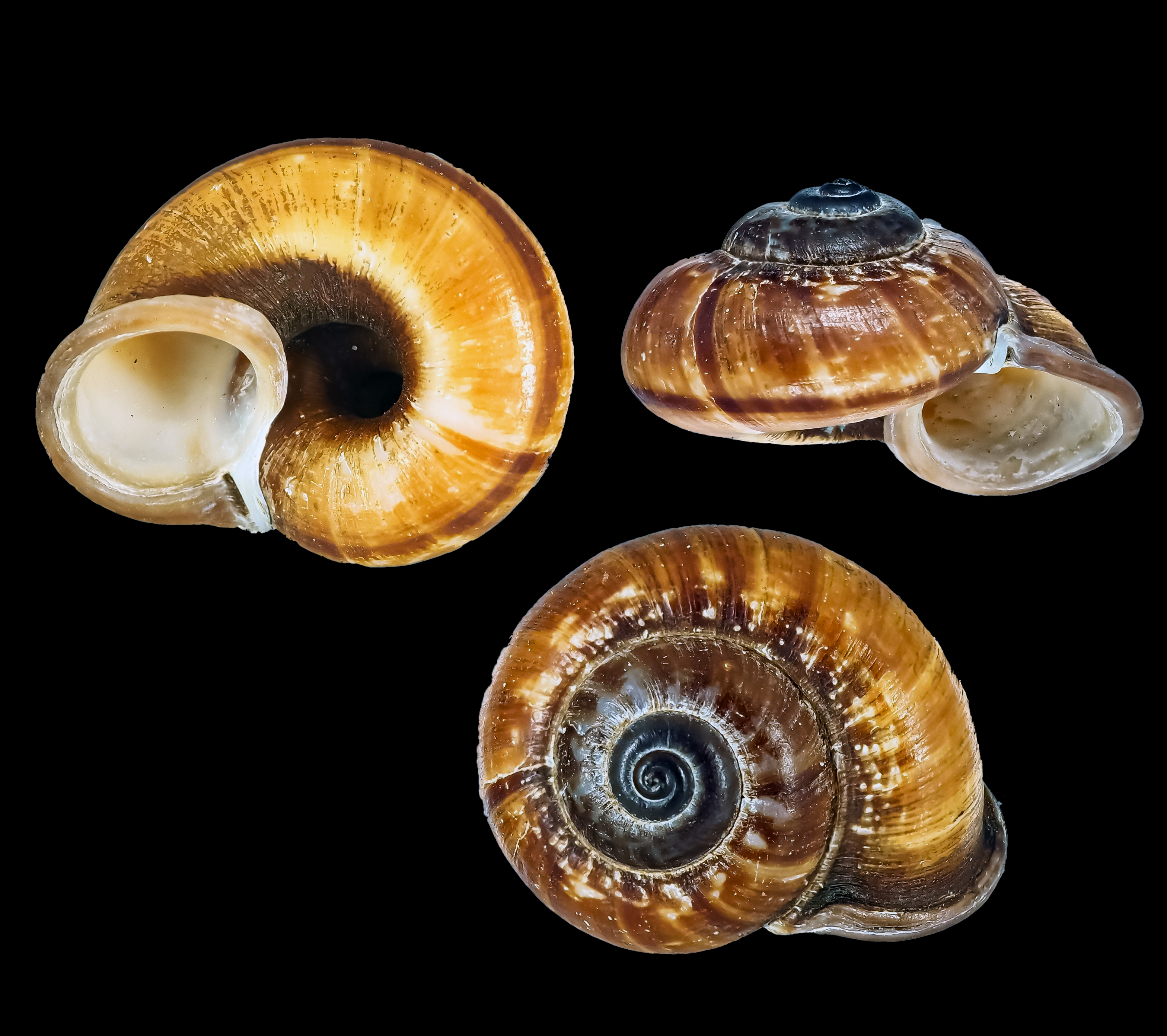
- Shell of Myxostoma boucheti (holotype at MNHN, Paris)

Scientific classification
- Domain: Eukaryota
- Kingdom: Animalia
- Phylum: Mollusca
- Class: Gastropoda
- Subclass: Caenogastropoda
- Order: Architaenioglossa
- Superfamily: Cyclophoroidea
- Family: Cyclophoridae
- Genus: Myxostoma; Troschel, 1847

Type species
- Turbo petiverianus W. Wood, 1828

Synonyms
- Cyclophorus (Myxostoma) Troschel, 1847 (unaccepted rank)

= Myxostoma =

Genus of gastropods

Myxostoma is a genus of land snails with a gill and an operculum, terrestrial gastropod mollusks in the subfamily Cyclophorinae of the family Cyclophoridae.

== Species ==
Species within the genus Myxostoma include:

- Myxostoma boucheti Thach, 2021
- Myxostoma lychnus (Morelet, 1862)
- Myxostoma messageri Bavay & Dautzenberg, 1904
- Myxostoma paradoxum Dautzenberg & H. Fischer, 1908
- Myxostoma petiverianum (Wood, 1828)

Synonyms

- Myxostoma aubryanum Heude, 1885: synonym of Ptychopoma aubryanum (Heude, 1885) (original combination)
- Myxostoma aureum Heude, 1885: synonym of Pterocyclos aureus (Heude, 1885) (original combination)
- Myxostoma delavayanum Heude, 1888: synonym of Ptychopoma delavayanum (Heude, 1888) (original combination)
- Myxostoma expoliatum Heude, 1885: synonym of Ptychopoma expoliatum (Heude, 1885) (original combination)
- Myxostoma humile Heude, 1885: synonym of Ptychopoma humile (Heude, 1885) (original combination)
- Myxostoma laciniata Heude, 1885: synonym of Scabrina laciniata (Heude, 1885) (original combination)
- Myxostoma laciniatum Heude, 1885: synonym of Scabrina laciniata (Heude, 1885) (original combination)
- Myxostoma lienense (Gredler, 1882): synonym of Ptychopoma lienense (Gredler, 1882) (unaccepted combination)
- Myxostoma recognitum Heude, 1885: synonym of Ptychopoma chinense (Möllendorff, 1874) (junior synonym)
- Myxostoma setchuanense Heude, 1885: synonym of Ptychopoma setchuanense (Heude, 1885) (original combination)
- Myxostoma subalatum Heude, 1886: synonym of Ptychopoma subalatum (Heude, 1886) (original combination)
- Myxostoma tortile Heude, 1885: synonym of Ptychopoma tortile (Heude, 1885) (original combination)
- Myxostoma tubulare Heude, 1885: synonym of Ptychopoma tubulare (Heude, 1885) (original combination)
- Myxostoma vestitum Heude, 1885: synonym of Ptychopoma expoliatum vestitum (Heude, 1885) (original combination)
