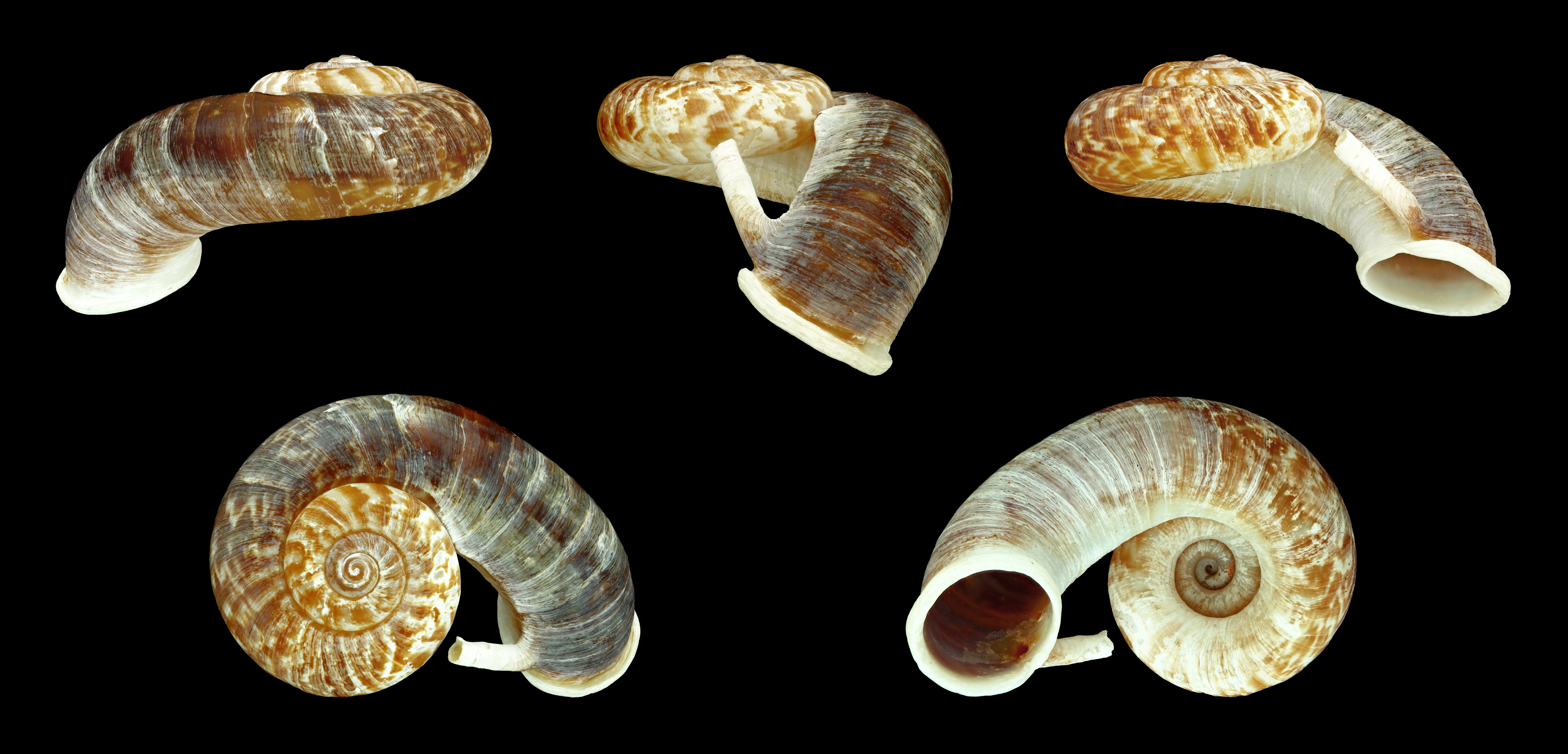
- The shell of Rhiostoma smithi

Scientific classification
- Kingdom: Animalia
- Phylum: Mollusca
- Class: Gastropoda
- Subclass: Caenogastropoda
- Order: Architaenioglossa
- Superfamily: Cyclophoroidea
- Family: Cyclophoridae
- Genus: Rhiostoma; Benson, 1860:

Type species
- Rhiostoma haughtoni Benson, 1860

= Rhiostoma =

Genus of gastropods

Rhiostoma is a genus of operculate land snails in the subfamily Cyclophorinae of the family Cyclophoridae, native to parts of Asia.

They are sometimes referred to as "snorkel snails" due to the tubular structure found on the final whorl of their shell, which resembles a snorkel.

== Description ==
The shell is subdiscoidal with a broad umbilicus. The last whorl is separate from the rest of the shell and features a tube-like snorkel structure. The operculum is multispiral.

== Etymology ==
The name is derived from "rhion" meaning a promontory and "stoma" meaning hole. In anatomy, a promontory is another word for a protuberance, so Rhiostoma can be understood to mean "protruding hole." This name refers to the snorkel on the shell which is the defining characteristic of the genus.

== Ecology ==
Somwang Pathamakanthin of Thailand said about the ecology of Rhiostoma, "As we have kept some living animals of Rhiostoma species in our garden, we know that most of them burrow into the ground during the day and are active only when it is raining or-sometimes-during the night, when the temperature is lower and the humidity is higher. When it is extremely hot during the day, we observed that species of the large variety of Rhiostoma smithi (from the Chanthaburi province) preferred to move into water, where they stayed for days! Others have been resting under the shade of trees, under rocks and fallen wood. We have been informed that the bluish Rhiostoma from Songkhla province prefers to burrow into the soil underneath fallen wood or under stones close to the foot of limestone hills."

== Taxonomy ==
Species within the genus Rhiostoma include

- Rhiostoma abletti Thach, 2016 (taxon inquirendum, debated synonym)
- † Rhiostoma americanum G. D. Hanna, 1920
- Rhiostoma asiphon Möllendorff, 1893
- Rhiostoma battambangense Thach & F. Huber, 2020
- Rhiostoma boxalli Godwin-Austen, 1893
- Rhiostoma cambodjense Morelet, 1875
- Rhiostoma chupingense Tomlin, 1938
- Rhiostoma dalyi Blanford, 1902
- Rhiostoma grohi Thach, 2020
- Rhiostoma hainesi Pfeiffer, 1862
- Rhiostoma haughtoni Benson, 1860
- Rhiostoma herosae Thach & F. Huber, 2017
- Rhiostoma housei (Haines, 1855)
- Rhiostoma huberi Thach, 2018
- Rhiostoma jalorense Sykes, 1903
- Rhiostoma jousseaumei de Morgan, 1885
- Rhiostoma macalpinewoodsi Laidlaw, 1939
- Rhiostoma marioni (Ancey, 1898)
- Rhiostoma morleti Dautzenberg & H. Fischer, 1906
- Rhiostoma ngocngai Thach & F. Huber, 2018
- Rhiostoma ngocthachi F. Huber, 2020
- Rhiostoma ninhbien D. S. Do, T. S. Nguyen & H. L. Do, 2020
- Rhiostoma samuiense
- Rhiostoma simplicilabre L. Pfeiffer, 1862
- Rhiostoma smithi Bartsch, 1932
- Rhiostoma strubelli Möllendorff, 1899
- Rhiostoma thachi F. Huber, 2018
- Rhiostoma thorsengi Thach, 2020
- Rhiostoma tomlini Salisbury, 1949

- Species brought into synonymy:

- Rhiostoma americana G. D. Hanna, 1920 †: synonym of Rhiostoma americanum G. D. Hanna, 1920 † (wrong gender agreement of specific epithet)
- Rhiostoma battambangensis Thach & F. Huber, 2020: synonym of Rhiostoma battambangense Thach & F. Huber, 2020 (wrong gender agreement of specific epithet)
- Rhiostoma bernardii L. Pfeiffer, 1862: synonym of Opisthoporus bernardii (L. Pfeiffer, 1862) (original combination)
- Rhiostoma cavernae Godwin-Austen, 1889: synonym of Opisthoporus cavernae (Godwin-Austen, 1889) (original combination)
- Rhiostoma gwendolenae Godwin-Austen, 1889: synonym of Cyclotus gwendolenae (Godwin-Austen, 1889) (original combination)
- Rhiostoma hungerfordi Godwin-Austen, 1889: synonym of Cyclotus hungerfordi (Godwin-Austen, 1889) (original combination)
- Rhiostoma iris Godwin-Austen, 1889: synonym of Cyclotus iris (Godwin-Austen, 1889) (original combination)
- Rhiostoma macalpine-woodsi Laidlaw, 1939: synonym of Rhiostoma macalpinewoodsi Laidlaw, 1939 (hyphens are not accepted in specific epithet)
- Rhiostoma ninhbinhensis Thach & F. Huber, 2018: synonym of Rhiostoma ninhbinhense Thach & F. Huber, 2018 (wrong gender agreement of specific epithet)
- Rhiostoma spelaeotes Tomlin, 1931: synonym of Pterocyclos spelaeotes (Tomlin, 1931) (original combination)

Taxa inquirenda

- Rhiostoma abletti Thach, 2016 (debated synonym)
- Rhiostoma christae Thach, 2016 (debated synonym)
- Rhiostoma ngocngai Thach & F. Huber, 2018 (debated synonym)
- Rhiostoma ninhbinhense Thach & F. Huber, 2018 (debated synonym
