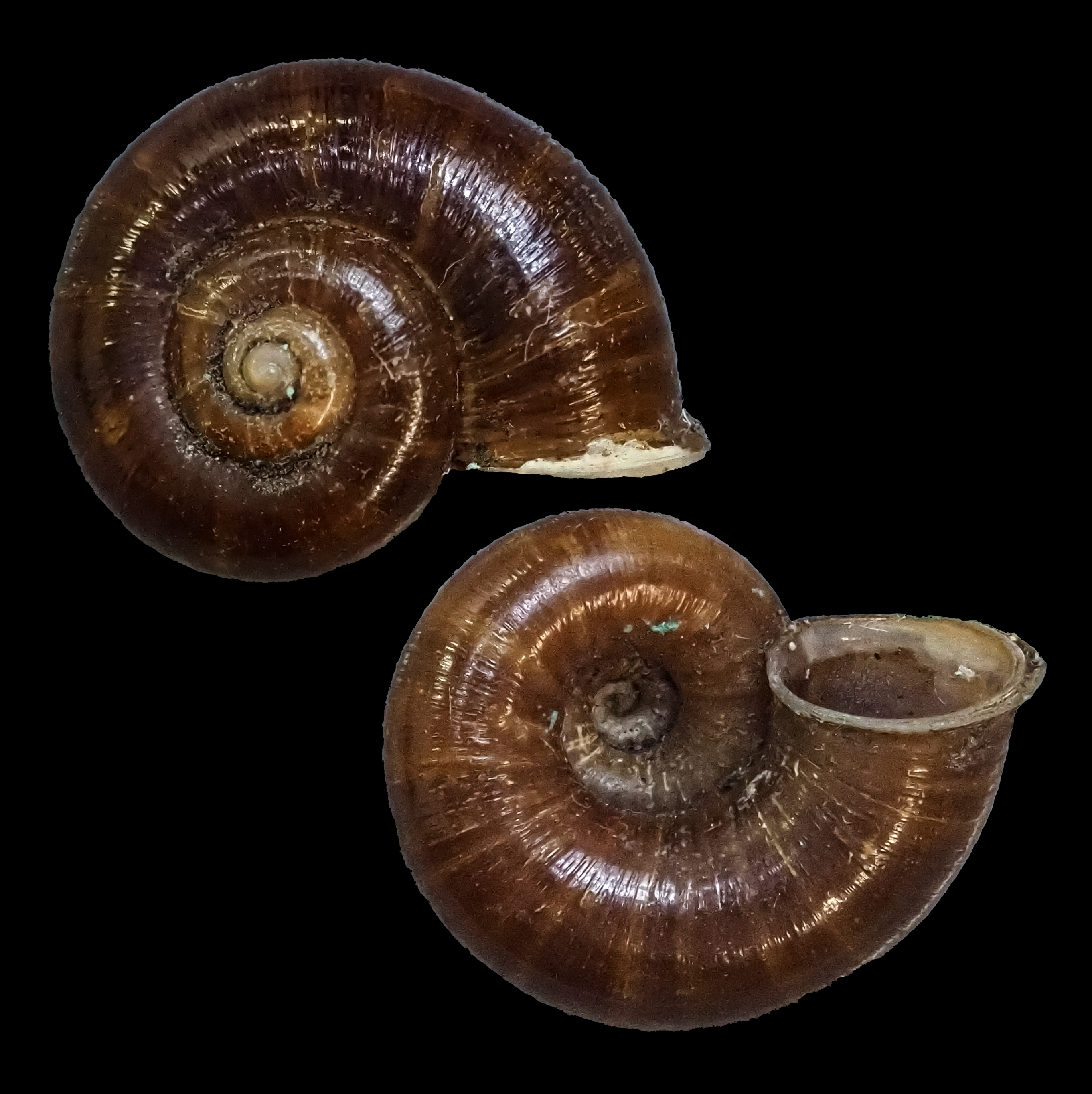
- Shell of Platyrhaphe franzhuberi (holotype at MNHN, Paris)

Scientific classification
- Kingdom: Animalia
- Phylum: Mollusca
- Class: Gastropoda
- Subclass: Caenogastropoda
- Order: Architaenioglossa
- Superfamily: Cyclophoroidea
- Family: Cyclophoridae
- Genus: Platyrhaphe; Swainson, 1840

Type species
- Cyclostoma pusillum G. B. Sowerby I, 1843

Synonyms
- Cyclotus (Platyrhaphe) Möllendorff, 1890 · unaccepted (unaccepted rank); Platyraphe Möllendorff, 1890 (incorrect subsequent spelling); Platyrhaphe (Platyraphella) Bartsch, 1919 · alternate representation; Platyrhaphe (Platyraphida) Bartsch, 1919 · alternate representation; Platyrhaphe (Platyraphina) Bartsch, 1919 · alternate representation; Platyrhaphe (Platyrhaphe) Möllendorff, 1890 · alternate representation

= Platyrhaphe =

Genus of gastropods

Platyrhaphe is a genus of tropical land snails in the subfamily Cyclophorinae of the family Cyclophoridae.

== Species ==
- Platyrhaphe anocampta (Möllendorff, 1895)
- Platyrhaphe anthopoma (Möllendorff, 1895)
- Platyrhaphe bakuitana Bartsch, 1919
- Platyrhaphe balabakensis Bartsch, 1919
- Platyrhaphe balukensis Bartsch, 1919
- Platyrhaphe bicolor (E. von Martens, 1903)
- Platyrhaphe bongaoensis (E. A. Smith, 1894)
- Platyrhaphe buriasensis Bartsch, 1919
- Platyrhaphe businensis Bartsch, 1919
- Platyrhaphe busuangensis Bartsch, 1919
- Platyrhaphe calamianensis Bartsch, 1919
- Platyrhaphe calayanensis Bartsch, 1919
- Platyrhaphe catanduanensis Bartsch, 1919
- Platyrhaphe cebuensis Bartsch, 1919
- Platyrhaphe conula Vermeulen, Luu, Theary & Anker, 2019
- Platyrhaphe coptoloma (Möllendorff, 1893)
- Platyrhaphe cruzana Bartsch, 1919
- Platyrhaphe erronea (Heude, 1890)
- Platyrhaphe eurystoma (Möllendorff, 1894)
- Platyrhaphe exigua (G. B. Sowerby I, 1843)
- Platyrhaphe expansilabris Möllendorff, 1897
- Platyrhaphe fodiens (Heude, 1882)
- Platyrhaphe fossor (Heude, 1886)
- Platyrhaphe franzhuberi Thach, 2021
- Platyrhaphe globula Bartsch, 1919
- Platyrhaphe gradata (Möllendorff, 1894)
- Platyrhaphe guimarasensis Bartsch, 1919
- Platyrhaphe harucuana (O. Boettger, 1891)
- Platyrhaphe hirasei (Pilsbry, 1901)
- Platyrhaphe hunana (Gredler, 1881)
- Platyrhaphe illota (A. Gould, 1859)
- Platyrhaphe jordana Bartsch, 1919
- Platyrhaphe lanyuensis Lee & Wu, 2001
- Platyrhaphe latecostata (Kobelt, 1884)
- Platyrhaphe lateplicata (Möllendorff, 1896)
- Platyrhaphe leucacme Möllendorff, 1901
- Platyrhaphe leytensis Bartsch, 1919
- Platyrhaphe linita (Godwin-Austen, 1889)
- Platyrhaphe lowi (de Morgan, 1885)
- Platyrhaphe lubangensis Bartsch, 1919
- Platyrhaphe malibagoana Bartsch, 1919
- Platyrhaphe mammillata (Quadras & Möllendorff, 1893)
- Platyrhaphe marinduquensis Bartsch, 1919
- Platyrhaphe masbatensis Bartsch, 1919
- Platyrhaphe mersispira Kobelt, 1912
- Platyrhaphe mindanensis Bartsch, 1919
- Platyrhaphe minuta (H. Adams, 1866)
- Platyrhaphe mucronata (G. B. Sowerby I, 1843)
- Platyrhaphe negrosensis Bartsch, 1919
- Platyrhaphe oblitus Yen, 1939
- Platyrhaphe palauiensis Bartsch, 1919
- Platyrhaphe palmasensis Bartsch, 1919
- Platyrhaphe parvula (E. von Martens, 1863)
- Platyrhaphe plebeia (G. B. Sowerby I, 1843)
- Platyrhaphe plicosa (E. von Martens, 1863)
- Platyrhaphe princessana Bartsch, 1919
- Platyrhaphe ptychoraphe (E. von Martens, 1864)
- Platyrhaphe pusilla (G. B. Sowerby I, 1843)
- Platyrhaphe quadrasi Zilch, 1956
- Platyrhaphe samarensis Bartsch, 1919
- Platyrhaphe saranganiensis Bartsch, 1919
- Platyrhaphe scalaris (L. Pfeiffer, 1851)
- Platyrhaphe schmackeri Möllendorff, 1897
- Platyrhaphe sibuyanensis Bartsch, 1919
- Platyrhaphe sordida (L. Pfeiffer, 1855)
- Platyrhaphe substriata (G. B. Sowerby I, 1843)
- Platyrhaphe sunggangensis Lee & Wu, 2001
- Platyrhaphe surigaoana Bartsch, 1919
- Platyrhaphe swinhoei (H. Adams, 1866)
- Platyrhaphe tiagana Zilch, 1956
- Platyrhaphe ticaoensis Bartsch, 1919
- Platyrhaphe toledoana Bartsch, 1919
- Platyrhaphe toppingi Bartsch, 1919
- Platyrhaphe ulugana Bartsch, 1919
- Platyrhaphe vatheleti Bavay & Dautzenberg, 1904
- Platyrhaphe vincentensis Bartsch, 1919
