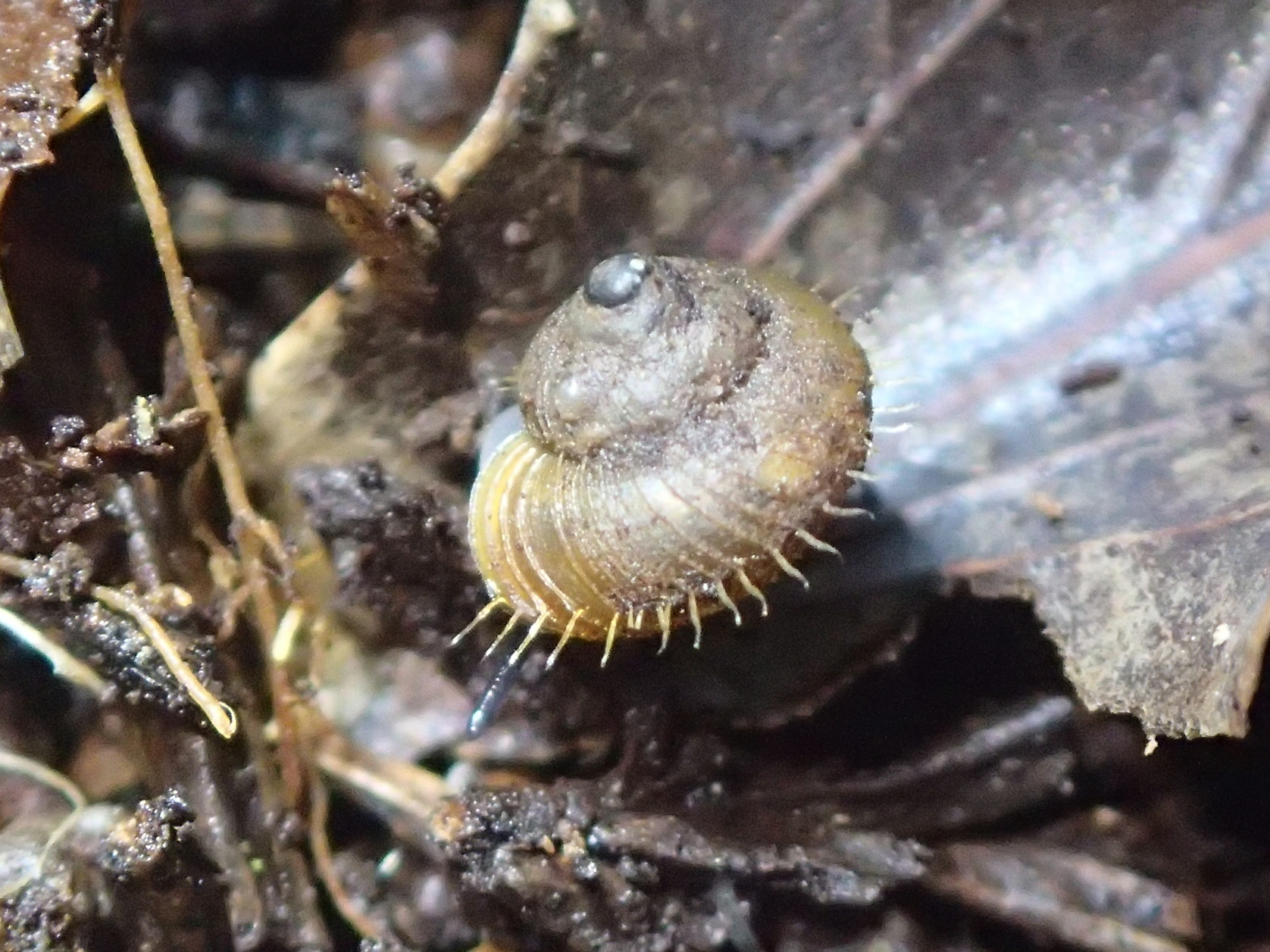
- Japonia katorii

Scientific classification
- Domain: Eukaryota
- Kingdom: Animalia
- Phylum: Mollusca
- Class: Gastropoda
- Subclass: Caenogastropoda
- Order: Architaenioglossa
- Superfamily: Cyclophoroidea
- Family: Cyclophoridae
- Genus: Japonia; Gould, 1859

Type species
- Cyclostoma barbata A. Gould, 1859

Synonyms
- Cyclostoma (Japonia) A. Gould, 1859 (original rank); Japonia (Japonia) A. A. Gould, 1859 · alternate representation; Japonia (Mylicotrochus) P. Sarasin & F. Sarasin, 1899 · alternate representation; Lagochilus (Japonia) Gould, 1859(superseded combination); Lagochilus (Mylicotrochus) P. Sarasin & F. Sarasin, 1899

= Japonia =

Genus of gastropods

Japonia is a genus of land snails with opercula, terrestrial gastropods in the subfamily Cyclophorinae of the family Cyclophoridae.

The genus was created by Augustus Addison Gould in 1959.

== Species ==
The genus Japonia includes the following species:

- Japonia alticola (Laidlaw, 1937)
- Japonia anceps Vermeulen, Liew & Schilthuizen, 2015
- Japonia balabacensis (E. A. Smith, 1895)
- Japonia bauensis Marzuki, T. S. Liew & Mohd-Azlan, 2021
- Japonia borneensis (E. A. Smith, 1893)
- Japonia buehleri Forcart, 1936
- Japonia bunguranensis (E. A. Smith, 1894)
- Japonia celebensis (P. Sarasin & F. Sarasin, 1899)
- Japonia changi C.-C. Hwang, 2015
- Japonia ciliocincta (Martens, 1865)
- Japonia citharella (Gould, 1859)
- Japonia clathrata (Heude, 1885)
- Japonia concolor (Möllendorff, 1893)
- Japonia crossei (Morlet, 1886)
- Japonia dido (Godwin-Austen, 1889)
- Japonia ditropis Vermeulen & Junau, 2007
- Japonia duplifolia C.-C. Hwang, 2015
- Japonia fallax B. Rensch, 1931
- Japonia formosana Pilsbry & Hirase, 1905
- Japonia gouldi Kobelt, 1902
- Japonia gradata (Möllendorff, 1894)
- Japonia hagenmulleri (J. Mabille, 1887)
- Japonia heteroveina C.-C. Hwang, 2015
- Japonia hispida Minato, 1982
- Japonia hyalina Vermeulen & Junau, 2007
- Japonia inornata (E. A. Smith, 1893)
- Japonia inouei Kuroda & Habe, 1961
- Japonia janus Vermeulen & Liew, 2022
- Japonia johnabbasi Thach, 2021
- Japonia jucunda (E. A. Smith, 1893)
- Japonia junipervallis C.-C. Hwang, 2015
- Japonia katorii Minato, 1985
- Japonia keppeli (Godwin-Austen, 1889)
- Japonia lanyuensis Y.-C. Lee & W.-L. Wu, 2001
- Japonia mariei (Morlet, 1886)
- Japonia mendicans (J. Mabille, 1887)
- Japonia metcalfei (Issel, 1874)
- Japonia monggisensis Vermeulen & Liew, 2022
- Japonia mucronata (Möllendorff, 1888)
- Japonia mundyana (Godwin-Austen, 1889)
- Japonia musiva (Gould, 1859)
- Japonia pngsiar C.-C. Hwang, 2015
- Japonia quinquelirata (Möllendorff, 1887)
- Japonia rabongensis (E. A. Smith, 1895)
- Japonia sadoensis Pilsbry & Y. Hirase, 1903
- Japonia saetigera (van Benthem Jutting, 195)
- Japonia shigetai Minato, 1985
- Japonia striatula Kuroda, 1973
- Japonia subcarinata (Möllendorff, 1887)
- Japonia subconica (L. Pfeiffer, 1859)
- Japonia subrudis Vermeulen & Liew, 2022
- Japonia tadai C.-C. Hwang, 2015
- Japonia tambunanensis Vermeulen & Liew, 2022
- Japonia tenuipilis (Gredler, 1887)
- Japonia thuthaoae Thach, 2021
- Japonia tokunoshimana Pilsbry & Y. Hirase, 1904
- Japonia trilirata (L. Pfeiffer, 1852)
- Japonia trochulus (Martens, 1867)
- Japonia wallacei (L. Pfeiffer, 1857)
