= Pholeoteras =

Scientific classification
- Kingdom: Animalia
- Phylum: Mollusca
- Class: Gastropoda
- Subclass: Caenogastropoda
- Order: Architaenioglossa
- Family: Cyclophoridae
- Genus: Pholeoteras; Sturany, 1904

Genus of land snails

Pholeoteras is a genus of gastropods belonging to the family Cyclophoridae.

The species of this genus are found in the Balkans.

Species:

- Pholeoteras euthrix Sturany, 1904
- Pholeoteras olympios Reischütz, Reischütz & Fischer, 2008
- Pholeoteras zilchi Subai, 1993
