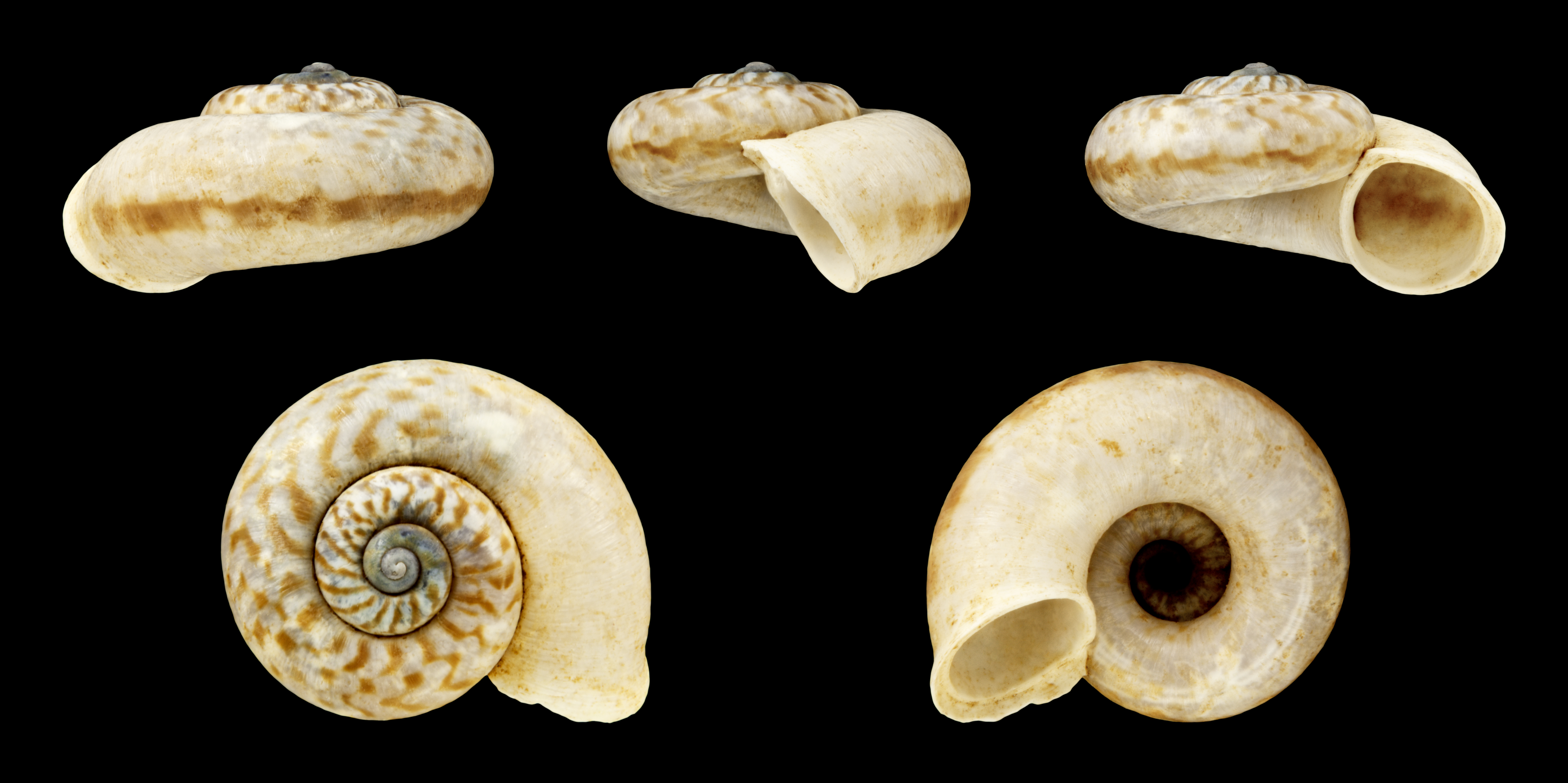
- Cyclotus variegatus

Scientific classification
- Kingdom: Animalia
- Phylum: Mollusca
- Class: Gastropoda
- Subclass: Caenogastropoda
- Order: Architaenioglossa
- Superfamily: Cyclophoroidea
- Family: Cyclophoridae
- Genus: Cyclotus; Swainson, 1840

Type species
- Cyclotus variegatus Swainson, 1840

Synonyms
- Cyclophorus (Cyclotus) Swainson, 1840 superseded rank; Cyclostoma (Cyclotus) Swainson, 1840 (unaccepted rank); Cyclotes Swainson, 1840 (incorrect subsequent spelling); Cyclotus (Aulacopoma) Möllendorff, 1897· accepted, alternate representation; Cyclotus (Cyclotus) Swainson, 1840· accepted, alternate representation; Cyclotus (Nakadaella) Ancey, 1904· accepted, alternate representation; Cyclotus (Procyclotus) P. Fischer, 1891· accepted, alternate representation; Cyclotus (Pseudocyclophorus) Möllendorff, 1890· accepted, alternate representation; Cyclotus (Siphonocyclus) Möllendorff, 1900· accepted, alternate representation; Tubicyclotus Habe, 1965 (junior synonym)

= Cyclotus =

Genus of gastropods

Cyclotus is a genus of tropical land snails in the subfamily Cyclophorinae of the family Cyclophoridae.

== Species ==
- Cyclotus adamsi Pilsbry & Hirase, 1906
- Cyclotus amabilis Fulton, 1905
- Cyclotus angulatus Martens, 1874
- Cyclotus approximans Heude, 1882
- Cyclotus atratus Ancey, 1890
- Cyclotus auriculatus Kobelt, 1884
- Cyclotus batchianensis L. Pfeiffer, 1861
- Cyclotus bemarahae Emberton, 2004
- Cyclotus bernsteini Martens, 1863
- Cyclotus biangulatus Martens, 1891
- Cyclotus bonensis P. Sarasin & F. Sarasin, 1899
- Cyclotus borealis (Möllendorff, 1885)
- Cyclotus boxalli Godwin-Austen, 1889
- Cyclotus buginensis P. Sarasin & F. Sarasin, 1899
- Cyclotus campanulatus Martens, 1865
- Cyclotus canaliculatus Möllendorff, 1895
- Cyclotus carinornatus Bollinger, 1918
- Cyclotus caroli Kobelt, 1884
- Cyclotus chinensis (L. Pfeiffer, 1855)
- Cyclotus confluens (L. Pfeiffer, 1860)
- Cyclotus conoideus Möllendorff, 1902
- Cyclotus cyclophoroides Möllendorff, 1890
- Cyclotus danieli (Morlet, 1886)
- Cyclotus daucinus (L. Pfeiffer, 1857)
- Cyclotus dautzenbergi (Sykes, 1902)
- Cyclotus difficillimus Schmacker & O. Boettger, 1890
- Cyclotus dimidiatus Kobelt, 1896
- Cyclotus discoideus (G. B. Sowerby I, 1843)
- Cyclotus discriminendus B. Rensch, 1934
- Cyclotus distomellus (G. B. Sowerby I, 1843)
- Cyclotus dohrni Kobelt, 1902
- Cyclotus euzonus Dohrn, 1889
- Cyclotus fasciatus Martens, 1864
- Cyclotus floresianus Martens, 1891
- Cyclotus fooni Thach & F. Huber, 2021
- Cyclotus fortunei (L. Pfeiffer, 1854)
- Cyclotus gallorum Emberton, 2004
- Cyclotus gassiesianus Crosse, 1867
- Cyclotus gordoni (Benson, 1863)
- Cyclotus griffithsi Emberton, 2004
- Cyclotus grohi (Thach & F. Huber, 2018) (taxon inquirendum)
- Cyclotus guttatus (L. Pfeiffer, 1853)
- Cyclotus gwendolenae (Godwin-Austen, 1889)
- Cyclotus hainanensis (H. Adams, 1870)
- Cyclotus hebraicus (Lesson, 1831)
- Cyclotus huberi Thach, 2018
- Cyclotus hungerfordi (Godwin-Austen, 1889)
- Cyclotus iris (Godwin-Austen, 1889)
- Cyclotus jellesmae P. Sarasin & F. Sarasin, 1899
- Cyclotus kaimanaensis Dharma, 2021
- Cyclotus labuanensis (L. Pfeiffer, 1864)
- Cyclotus latruncularius P. Sarasin & F. Sarasin, 1899
- Cyclotus lepidotus Vermeulen, 1996
- Cyclotus leytensis Möllendorff, 1890
- Cyclotus lindstedti (L. Pfeiffer, 1857)
- Cyclotus liratus Möllendorff, 1902
- Cyclotus longipilus Martens, 1865
- Cyclotus lowianus (L. Pfeiffer, 1864)
- Cyclotus macassaricus P. Sarasin & F. Sarasin, 1899
- Cyclotus mamillaris Odhner, 1919
- Cyclotus masbatensis Pilsbry, 1928
- Cyclotus meyeri P. Sarasin & F. Sarasin, 1899
- Cyclotus microchilus (Crosse, 1868)
- Cyclotus micromamillaris Emberton, 2004
- Cyclotus mindaiensis (Bock, 1881)
- Cyclotus mindoricus Quadras & Möllendorff, 1896
- Cyclotus minor (Martens, 1872)
- Cyclotus namorokae Emberton, 2004
- Cyclotus natunensis E. A. Smith, 1894
- Cyclotus niasensis Fulton, 1907
- Cyclotus nigrispirus P. Sarasin & F. Sarasin, 1899
- Cyclotus novoguineensis Tapparone Canefri, 1883
- Cyclotus obscuratus B. Rensch, 1931
- Cyclotus palawanicus E. A. Smith, 1895
- Cyclotus pandarus P. Sarasin & F. Sarasin, 1899
- Cyclotus peramplas E. von Martens, 1903
- Cyclotus politus (G. B. Sowerby I, 1843)
- Cyclotus porrectus Möllendorff, 1898
- Cyclotus pruinosus Martens, 1863
- Cyclotus pseudoreticulatus Rensch, 1933
- Cyclotus pterocycloides (L. Pfeiffer, 1855)
- Cyclotus pyrostoma E. A. Smith, 1896
- Cyclotus ranae B. Rensch, 1931
- Cyclotus schomburgianus Möllendorff, 1883
- Cyclotus semiliratus Möllendorff, 1896
- Cyclotus setosus (Möllendorff, 1894)
- Cyclotus siamensis (Martens, 1860)
- Cyclotus simonianus (Heude, 1886)
- Cyclotus simplicissimus B. Rensch, 1933
- Cyclotus smithi Kobelt, 1902
- Cyclotus solutus (Stoliczka, 1872)
- Cyclotus sontraensis Thach & F. Huber, 2020
- Cyclotus spiniferus (Morelet, 1861)
- Cyclotus stenomphalus Heude, 1882
- Cyclotus stoevi Thach & F. Huber, 2021
- Cyclotus subflammulatus L. Pfeiffer, 1861
- Cyclotus succinctus Martens, 1864
- Cyclotus sulcatus Möllendorff, 1890
- Cyclotus sumatranus (Martens, 1864)
- Cyclotus taivanus H. Adams, 1870
- Cyclotus tener (Menke, 1856)
- Cyclotus tourannensis (Eydoux & Souleyet, 1852)
- Cyclotus trusanensis Godwin-Austen, 1889
- Cyclotus tubaeformis Möllendorff, 1882
- Cyclotus tubuliferus (L. Pfeiffer, 1854)
- Cyclotus variegatusSwainson, 1840
- Cyclotus yeni Zilch, 1956

== Synonyms ==
- Cyclotus (Opisthoporus) Benson, 1851: synonym of Opisthoporus Benson, 1851
- Cyclotus amboinensis (L. Pfeiffer, 1854); synonym of Cyclotus politus (G. B. Sowerby I, 1843) (unaccepted > junior subjective synonym)
- Cyclotus birostris (L. Pfeiffer, 1855): synonym of Opisthoporus birostris (L. Pfeiffer, 1855) (unaccepted combination)
- Cyclotus bourguignati Doumet-Adanson, 1885: synonym of Caspicyclotus sieversi (L. Pfeiffer, 1871) (junior synonym)
- Cyclotus charmian Hutton, 1883: synonym of Gonatorhaphe fornicata (L. Pfeiffer, 1854)
- Cyclotus cochinchinensis (L. Pfeiffer, 1857): synonym of Rhiostoma cochinchinense (L. Pfeiffer, 1857) (unaccepted > superseded combination)
- Cyclotus euryomphalus (L. Pfeiffer, 1857): synonym of Opisthoporus euryomphalus (L. Pfeiffer, 1857) (unaccepted combination)
- Cyclotus fulminulatus Martens, 1865: synonym of Cyclotus politus (G. B. Sowerby I, 1843) (junior subjective synonym)
- Cyclotus herzi O. Boettger, 1889: synonym of Caspicyclotus sieversi (L. Pfeiffer, 1871) (junior synonym)
- Cyclotus laevigatus F. Sandberger, 1870 †: synonym of Procyclotopsis laevigatus (F. Sandberger, 1870) † (new combination)
- Cyclotus lombockensis E. A. Smith, 1898: synonym of Cyclotus politus (G. B. Sowerby I, 1843) (unaccepted > superseded combination
- Cyclotus pulchellus (Morelet, 1889): synonym of Rhiostoma cambodjense (Morelet, 1875)
- Cyclotus scalaris Miller, 1907 †: synonym of Pomatias (Neobembridgia) arneggensis Wenz, 1923 † represented as Pomatias arneggensis Wenz, 1923 † (junior secondary homonym of Cyclostoma scalare Pfeiffer, 1851, later placed in Cyclotus)
- Cyclotus reticulatus Martens, 1864: synonym of Cyclotus politus (G. B. Sowerby I, 1843)
- Cyclotus sieversi L. Pfeiffer, 1871: synonym of Caspicyclotus sieversi (L. Pfeiffer, 1871) (new combination)
- Cyclotus suluanus E. A. Smith, 1894: synonym of Cyclotus politus (G. B. Sowerby I, 1843)
- Cyclotus trailli L. Pfeiffer, 1862: synonym of Cyclotopsis trailli (L. Pfeiffer, 1862)
- Cyclotus vicinus E. A. Smith, 1896: synonym of Cyclotus politus (G. B. Sowerby I, 1843)
