= Nobuea =

Scientific classification
- Kingdom: Animalia
- Phylum: Mollusca
- Class: Gastropoda
- Subclass: Caenogastropoda
- Order: Architaenioglossa
- Family: Cyclophoridae
- Genus: Nobuea; Kuroda & Miyanaga, 1943

Genus of gastropods

Nobuea is a genus of tropical land snails with an operculum, terrestrial gastropod mollusks in the family Cyclophoridae.

== Species ==
Species within the genus Nobuea include:

- Nobuea elegantistriata Kuroda & Miyanaga, 1943
- Nobuea kurodai
- Nobuea sp. of Kimura & Noseworthy (2020)
