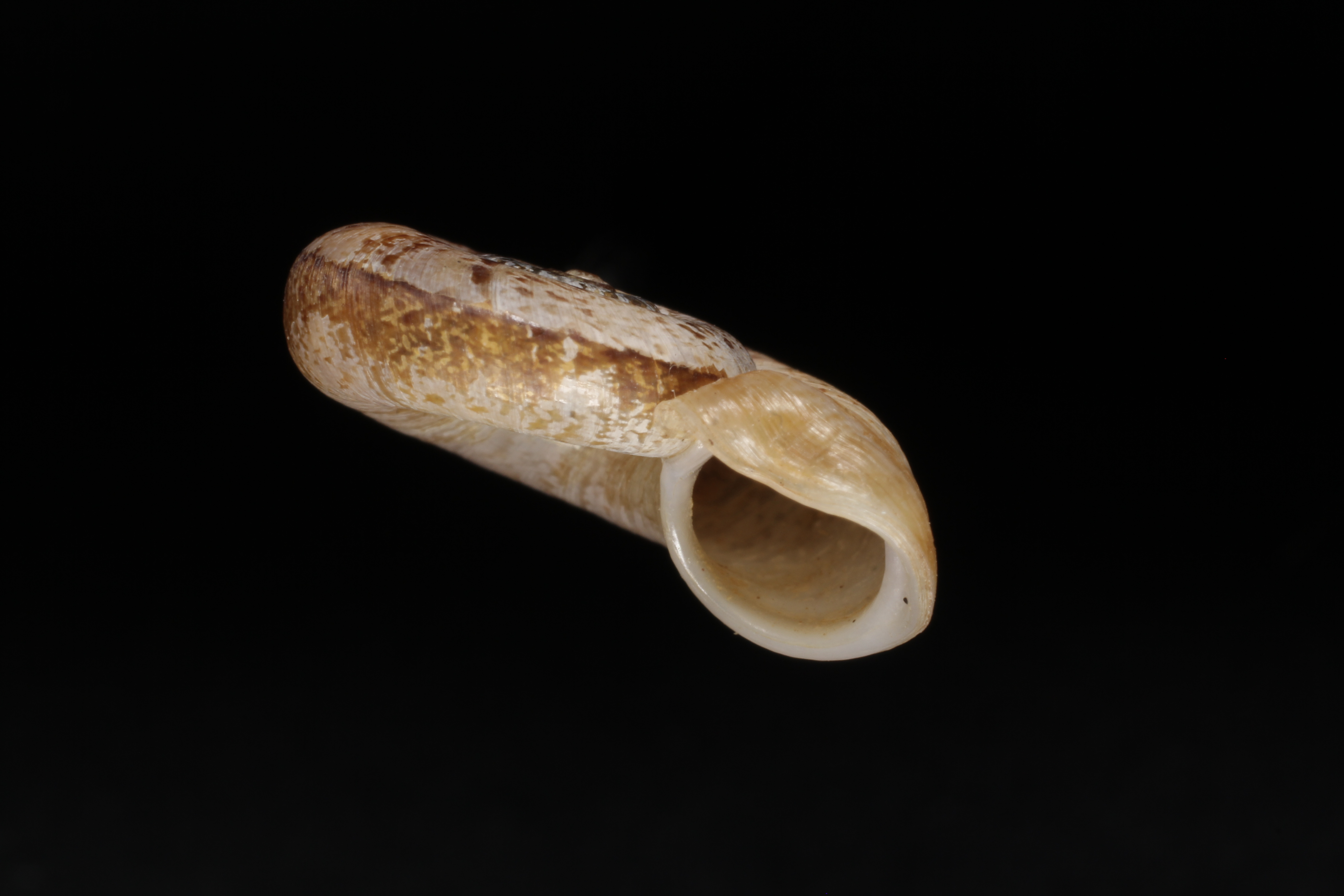
- Shell of Pterocyclos heinrichhuberi (holotype at MNHN, Paris)

Scientific classification
- Kingdom: Animalia
- Phylum: Mollusca
- Class: Gastropoda
- Subclass: Caenogastropoda
- Order: Architaenioglossa
- Superfamily: Cyclophoroidea
- Family: Cyclophoridae
- Genus: Pterocyclos; Benson, 1832

Type species
- Pterocyclos rupestris Benson, 1832

Synonyms
- Cyclostoma (Pterocyclos) Benson, 1832; Pterocyclus P. Fischer, 1885 (unjustified emendation of Pterocyclos); Steganotoma Troschel, 1837 (junior synonym)

= Pterocyclos =

Genus of gastropods

Pterocyclos is a genus of tropical land snails in the subfamily Cyclophorinae of the family Cyclophoridae.

== Species ==
- Pterocyclos aborensis Godwin-Austen, 1915
- Pterocyclos albersi L. Pfeiffer, 1847
- Pterocyclos amabilis Fulton, 1905
- Pterocyclos anamullayensis Sutcharit & Panha, 2019
- Pterocyclos anguliferus (Souleyet, 1841)
- Pterocyclos aspersus Bullen, 1906
- Pterocyclos ater Stoliczka, 1871
- Pterocyclos aureus (Heude, 1885)
- Pterocyclos baruensis H. Rolle, 1908
- Pterocyclos berthae Dautzenberg & Hamonville, 1887
- Pterocyclos bifrons L. Pfeiffer, 1855
- Pterocyclos bilabiatus Benson, 1835
- Pterocyclos blandi Benson, 1851
- Pterocyclos brahmakundensis Godwin-Austen, 1915
- Pterocyclos celebensis (E. A. Smith, 1896)
- Pterocyclos cetra Benson, 1856
- Pterocyclos cingalensis Benson, 1853
- Pterocyclos comatus Beddome, 1881
- Pterocyclos cucullus Godwin-Austen, 1889
- Pterocyclos cumingi L. Pfeiffer, 1851
- Pterocyclos cyclophoroideus G. Nevill, 1881
- Pterocyclos diluvium Sutcharit & Panha, 2014
- Pterocyclos eudaedaleus Crosse, 1869
- Pterocyclos feddeni W. T. Blanford, 1865
- Pterocyclos foveolatus E. von Martens, 1908
- Pterocyclos franzhuberi Thach, 2017
- Pterocyclos frednaggsi Sutcharit & Panha, 2014
- Pterocyclos friedae Thach & F. Huber, 2016
- Pterocyclos heinrichhuberi Thach & F. Huber, 2020
- Pterocyclos huberi Thach, 2015
- Pterocyclos insignis Theobald, 1865
- Pterocyclos kintanum (de Morgan, 1885)
- Pterocyclos kobelti Clench & Archer, 1932
- Pterocyclos latilabrum E. A. Smith, 1895
- Pterocyclos magnus Godwin-Austen, 1876
- Pterocyclos marionae Preston, 1914
- Pterocyclos miriensis Godwin-Austen, 1915
- Pterocyclos moellendorffi Kobelt, 1909
- Pterocyclos moluccensis Kobelt, 1897
- Pterocyclos nanus Benson, 1851
- Pterocyclos niahensis Godwin-Austen, 1889
- Pterocyclos perrieri Morlet, 1889
- Pterocyclos prestoni Bavay & Dautzenberg, 1909
- Pterocyclos pseudocumingi Möllendorff, 1897
- Pterocyclos pullatus Benson, 1856
- Pterocyclos puriensis (G. Nevill, 1878)
- Pterocyclos rupestris Benson, 1832
- Pterocyclos schileykoi Thach & F. Huber, 2017
- Pterocyclos schmackeri Möllendorff, 1897
- Pterocyclos sluiteri O. Boettger, 1890
- Pterocyclos spelaeotes (Tomlin, 1931)
- Pterocyclos spiramentum Godwin-Austen, 1915
- Pterocyclos spiroliratus Djajasasmita, 1988
- Pterocyclos subalatus Sykes, 1903
- Pterocyclos subulatus Benson, 1903
- Pterocyclos tenuilabiatus (Metcalfe, 1852)
- Pterocyclos thachi F. Huber, 2017
- Pterocyclos troscheli Benson, 1851
- Pterocyclos umbraticus (van Benthem Jutting, 1949)

Taxa inquirenda

- Pterocyclos liuanus Gredler, 1885
- Pterocyclos microchilus Crosse, 1868

Synonyms

- Pterocyclos (Spiraculum) Pearson, 1833: synonym of Spiraculum Pearson, 1833 (unaccepted rank)
- Pterocyclos (Spiraculum) mastersi (W. T. Blanford, 1877): synonym of Spiraculum mastersi W. T. Blanford, 1877 (unaccepted combination)
- Pterocyclos (Spiraculum) mastersi Blanford, 1877: synonym of Spiraculum mastersi W. T. Blanford, 1877
- Pterocyclos albersi L. Pfeiffer, 1847: synonym of Crossopoma albersi (L. Pfeiffer, 1847) (original combination)
- Pterocyclos bathyschisma Möllendorff, 1898: synonym of Ptychopoma bathyschisma (Möllendorff, 1898) (original combination)
- Pterocyclos biciliatum Mousson, 1849: synonym of Opisthoporus biciliatus (Mousson, 1849) (original combination)
- Pterocyclos cambodjensis Morelet, 1875: synonym of Rhiostoma cambodjense (Morelet, 1875) (original combination)
- Pterocyclos chinensis Möllendorff, 1874: synonym of Ptychopoma chinense (Möllendorff, 1874) (original combination)
- Pterocyclos cycloteus Gredler, 1885: synonym of Ptychopoma cycloteum (Gredler, 1885) (original combination)
- Pterocyclos danieli Morlet, 1886: synonym of Cyclotus danieli (Morlet, 1886) (junior synonym)
- Pterocyclos gerlachi Möllendorff, 1882: synonym of Pterocyclus gerlachi Möllendorff, 1882 (incorrect spelling of genus name)
- Pterocyclos hainanensis H. Adams, 1870: synonym of Cyclotus hainanensis (H. Adams, 1870) (original combination)
- Pterocyclos hensanensis Gredler, 1886: synonym of Ptychopoma lienense hensanense (Gredler, 1886) (original combination and rank)
- Pterocyclos hispidus (Pearson, 1833): synonym of Spiraculum hispidum Pearson, 1833 (unaccepted combination)
- Pterocyclos incomptus (G. B. Sowerby I, 1850): synonym of Incidostoma incomptum (G. B. Sowerby I, 1850) (superseded combination)
- Pterocyclos labuanensis L. Pfeiffer, 1864: synonym of Cyclotus labuanensis (L. Pfeiffer, 1864) (original combination)
- Pterocyclos lienensis Gredler, 1882: synonym of Ptychopoma lienense lienense (Gredler, 1882) (original combination)
- Pterocyclos liuanum Gredler, 1885: synonym of Ptychopoma lienense liuanum (Gredler, 1885) (original combination and rank)
- Pterocyclos lowianus L. Pfeiffer, 1864: synonym of Cyclotus lowianus (L. Pfeiffer, 1864) (original combination)
- Pterocyclos marioni Ancey, 1898: synonym of Rhiostoma marioni (Ancey, 1898) (original combination)
- Pterocyclos mindaiensis Bock, 1881: synonym of Cyclotus mindaiensis (Bock, 1881) (original combination)
- Pterocyclos parva Pease, 1865: synonym of Garrettia parva (Pease, 1865) (original combination)
- Pterocyclos parvus (Pearson, 1833): synonym of Spiraculum parvum Pearson, 1833 (unaccepted combination)
- Pterocyclos regelspergeri (de Morgan, 1885): synonym of Spiraculum regelspergeri (de Morgan, 1885)
- Pterocyclos spaleotes (Tomlin, 1931): synonym of Pterocyclos spelaeotes (Tomlin, 1931) (incorrect subsequent spelling)
- Pterocyclos sumatranus E. von Martens, 1864: synonym of Cyclotus sumatranus (E. von Martens, 1864) (original combination)
- Pterocyclos tener Menke, 1857: synonym of Cyclotus tener (Menke, 1856) (original combination)
- Pterocyclos tristis Blanford, 1869: synonym of Theobaldius tristis (Blanford, 1869)
- Pterocyclos vanbuensis E. A. Smith, 1896: synonym of Scabrina vanbuensis (E. A. Smith, 1896) (original combination)
- Pterocyclos wilsoni L. Pfeiffer, 1866: synonym of Ptychopoma wilsoni (L. Pfeiffer, 1866) (original combination)
