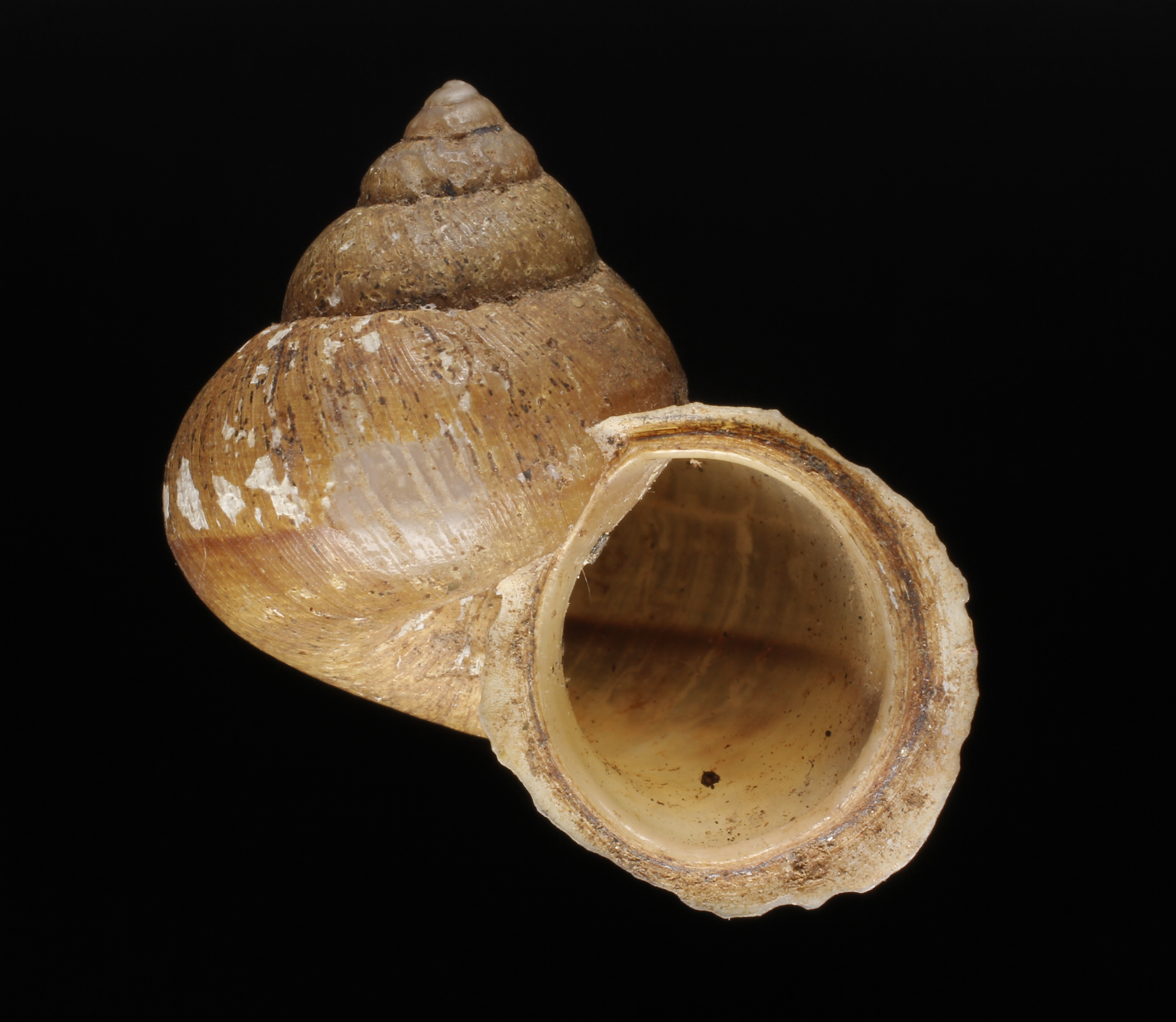
- Shell of Acroptychia aequivoca (syntype at MNHN, Paris)

Scientific classification
- Kingdom: Animalia
- Phylum: Mollusca
- Class: Gastropoda
- Subclass: Caenogastropoda
- Order: Architaenioglossa
- Superfamily: Cyclophoroidea
- Family: Cyclophoridae
- Genus: Acroptychia; Crosse & P. Fischer, 1877

Type species
- Euptychia metableta Crosse & P. Fischer, 1873

Synonyms
- Anceyiella Mabille, 1886; Euptychia Crosse & P. Fischer, 1873 (junior primary homonym of Euptychia Hübner, 1816 (Lepidoptera))

= Acroptychia =

Genus of gastropods

Acroptychia is a taxonomic genus of small to large tropical land snails with an operculum, terrestrial gastropod mollusks in the family Cyclophoridae.

== Species ==
- Acroptychia aequivoca (L. Pfeiffer, 1857)
- Acroptychia bathiei Fischer-Piette & Bedoucha, 1965
- Acroptychia bigoti Fischer-Piette, F. Blanc & Salvat, 1969
- Acroptychia culminans Fischer-Piette & Bedoucha, 1965
- Acroptychia mahafinaritra K. C. Emberton, Slapcinsky, C. A. Campbell, Rakotondrazafy, Andriamiarison & J. D. Emberton, 2010
- Acroptychia metableta (Crosse & P. Fischer, 1873)
- Acroptychia milloti Fischer-Piette & Bedoucha, 1965
- Acroptychia pauliana Fischer-Piette & Bedoucha, 1965
- Acroptychia pauper Fischer-Piette, F. Blanc & Salvat, 1969
- Acroptychia pyramidalis Sykes, 1900
- Acroptychia salvati (Fischer-Piette & Bedoucha, 1965)
- Acroptychia tubulare (Morelet, 1861)

Synonyms

- Acroptychia albocincta E. A. Smith, 1893: synonym of Boucardicus albocinctus (E. A. Smith, 1893) (original combination)
- Acroptychia manicata Crosse & P. Fischer, 1883: synonym of Acroptychia aequivoca (L. Pfeiffer, 1857) (junior synonym)
- Acroptychia metablata [sic]: synonym of Acroptychia metableta (Crosse & P. Fischer, 1873) (misspelling)
- Acroptychia notabilis E. A. Smith, 1892: synonym of Boucardicus notabilis (E. A. Smith, 1892) (original combination)
