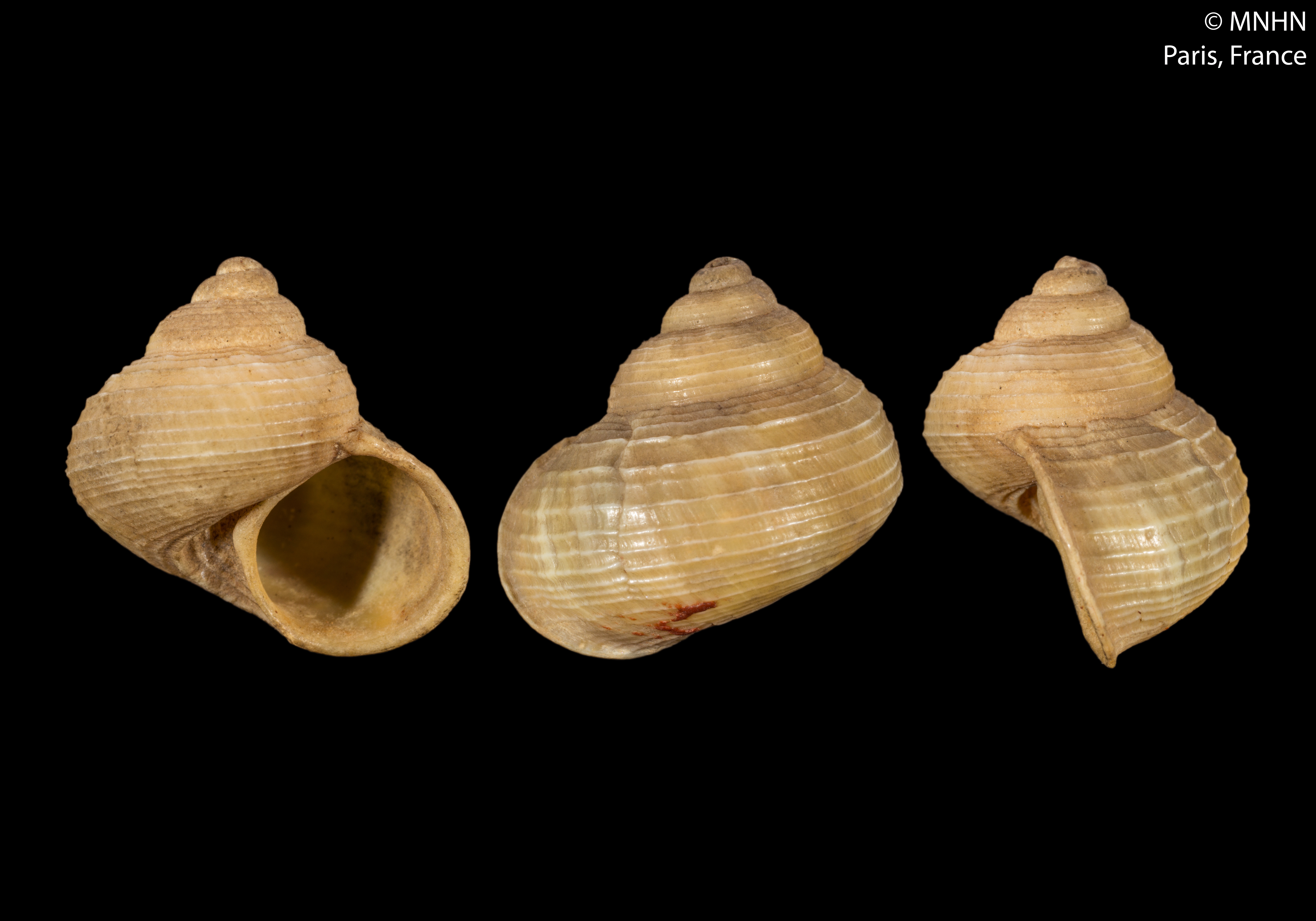
- Shell of Otopoma naticoides (syntype at MNHN, Paris)

Scientific classification
- Kingdom: Animalia
- Phylum: Mollusca
- Class: Gastropoda
- Subclass: Caenogastropoda
- Order: Architaenioglossa
- Family: Cyclophoridae
- Genus: Otopoma; Gray, 1850

Type species
- Turbo foliaceus Gmelin, 1791

Synonyms
- Cyclostoma (Otopoma) Gray, 1850

= Otopoma =

Genus of gastropods

Otopoma is a genus of land snails, terrestrial gastropod mollusks in the subfamily Cyclophorinae of the family Cyclophoridae.

== Species ==
Species in the genus Otopoma include:

- Otopoma anaglyptum Morelet, 1886
- † Otopoma burgundiae (J. Martin, 1866)
- † Otopoma cadurcense (Noulet, 1854)
- † Otopoma carthusianum (Martin, 1866)
- † Otopoma filholi Filhol, 1877
- Otopoma foliaceum (Gmelin, 1791)
- Otopoma revoili (Bourguignat, 1882)

Taxa inquirenda

- Otopoma artuffeli Jousseaume, 1882
- Otopoma blennus Benson, 1856
- Otopoma flexilabrum (G. B. Sowerby I, 1843)

Synonyms

- Otopoma aequatorium Morelet, 1890: synonym of Tropidophora aequatoria (Morelet, 1890) (original combination)
- Otopoma anaglyptum Morelet, 1890: synonym of Tropidophora anaglypta (Morelet, 1890) (original combination)
- Otopoma bentianum Melvill, 1895: synonym of Rochebrunia bentiana (Melvill, 1895) (original combination)
- Otopoma blennus Benson, 1859: synonym of Pollicaria gravida (Benson, 1856)
- Otopoma clathratulum (Récluz, 1843): synonym of Socotora clathratula (Récluz, 1843) (new combination)
- Otopoma clausum Benson, 1859: synonym of Otopoma hinduorum W. T. Blanford, 1864: synonym of Rochebrunia hinduorum (W. T. Blanford, 1864) (incorrect identification )
- Otopoma complanatum Godwin-Austen, 1881: synonym of Socotora albicans albicans (G. B. Sowerby I, 1839) (junior synonym)
- Otopoma conicum Godwin-Austen, 1881: synonym of Dioscopoma conicum conicum (Godwin-Austen, 1881) (original name)
- Otopoma consimile Melvill & Ponsonby, 1896: synonym of Rochebrunia dhofarense (Melvill & Ponsonby, 1896) (junior synonym)
- Otopoma dhofarense Melvill & Ponsonby, 1896: synonym of Rochebrunia dhofarense (Melvill & Ponsonby, 1896) (original combination)
- † Otopoma divionense (Martin, 1866) : synonym of † Georgia divionensis (J. Martin, 1866)
- Otopoma hadramauticum Melvill & Ponsonby, 1896: synonym of Rochebrunia bentiana (Melvill, 1895) (junior synonym)
- Otopoma hinduorum W. T. Blanford, 1864: synonym of Rochebrunia hinduorum (W. T. Blanford, 1864) (original combination)
- Otopoma humbloti Morelet, 1886: synonym of Tropidophora humbloti (Morelet, 1886) (original combination)
- Otopoma macgregoriae Hedley, 1894: synonym of Dominamaria macgregoriae (Hedley, 1894) (original combination)
- Otopoma naticoides (Récluz, 1843): synonym of Socotora naticoides (Récluz, 1843)
- Otopoma obtusum L. Pfeiffer, 1862: synonym of Rochebrunia obtusa (L. Pfeiffer, 1862) (original combination)
- Otopoma perrieri Bourguignat, 1881: synonym of Rochebrunia perrieri (Bourguignat, 1881) (original combination)
- Otopoma philippianum L. Pfeiffer, 1852: synonym of Tropidophora philippiana (L. Pfeiffer, 1852) (original combination)
- Otopoma poirieri Bourguignat, 1881: synonym of Rochebrunia perrieri (Bourguignat, 1881) (junior synonym)
- Otopoma polyzonatum Morelet, 1886: synonym of Tropidophora polyzonata (Morelet, 1886) (original combination)
- † Otopoma triexaratum (J. Martin, 1866) : synonym of † Georgia (Arabia) triexarata (J. Martin, 1866)
