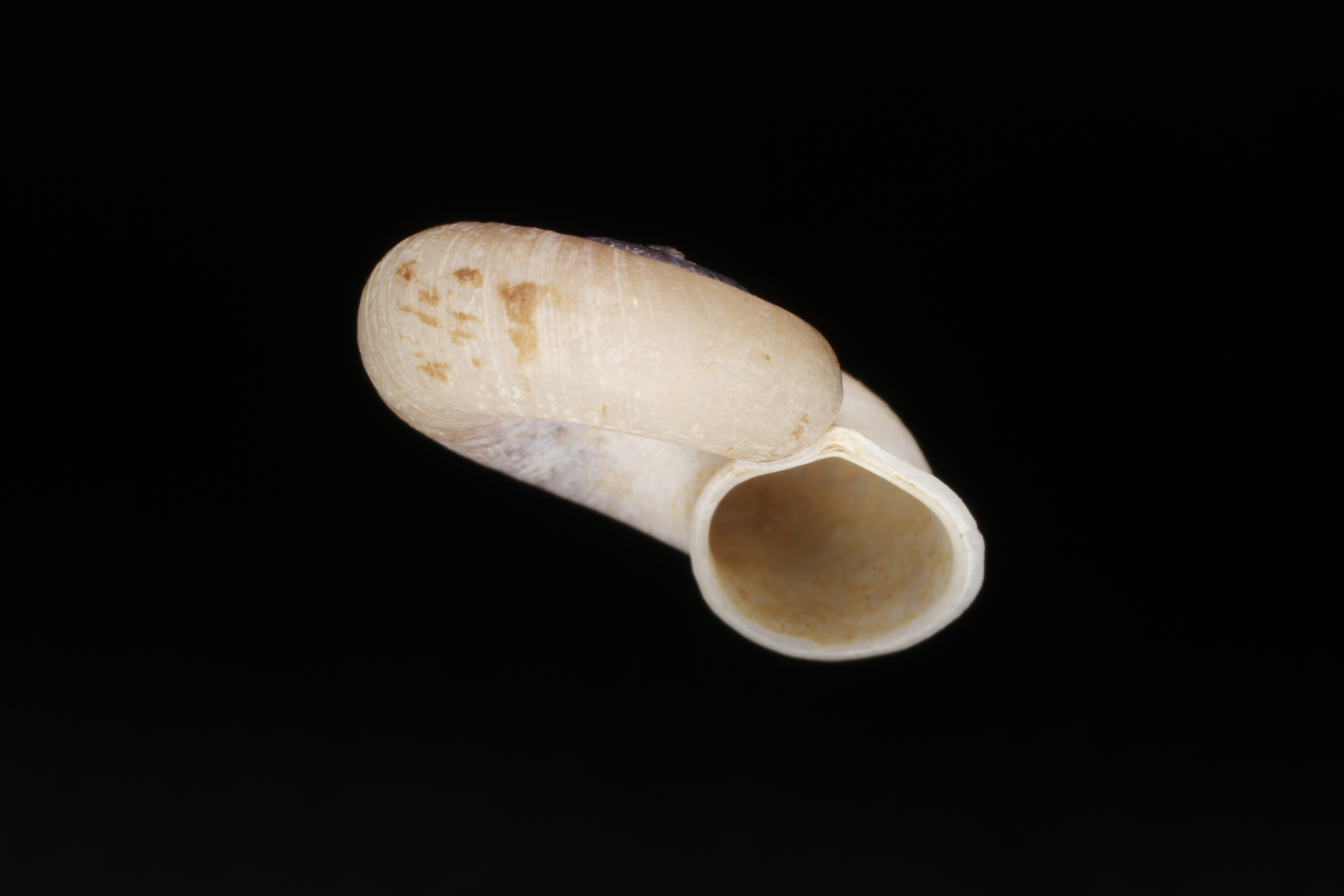
- Shell of Scabrina franzhuberi (holotype at MNHN, Paris)

Scientific classification
- Kingdom: Animalia
- Phylum: Mollusca
- Class: Gastropoda
- Subclass: Caenogastropoda
- Order: Architaenioglossa
- Superfamily: Cyclophoroidea
- Family: Cyclophoridae
- Genus: Scabrina; W. T. Blanford, 1863

Type species
- Cyclophorus pinnulifer Benson, 1857

Synonyms
- Cyclophorus (Scabrina) W. T. Blanford, 1863 (original rank); Cyclophorus (Scabrinus) W.T. Blanford, 1863 (incorrect subsequent spelling); Dasytherion J. Mabille, 1887 (junior synonym)

= Scabrina =

Genus of gastropods

Scabrina is a genus of operculate land snails, terrestrial gastropod mollusks in the subfamily Cyclophorinae of the family Cyclophoridae.

== Species ==
Species in the genus Scabrina include:

- Scabrina basisulcata (E. von Martens, 1897)
- Scabrina belang Foon & Marzuki, 2022
- Scabrina brounae (Sykes, 1898)
- Scabrina calyx (Benson, 1856)
- Scabrina fimbriosa (Möllendorff, 1885)
- Scabrina franzhuberi Thach, 2020
- Scabrina hirsuta (Möllendorff, 1884)
- Scabrina hispidula (W. T. Blanford, 1863)
- Scabrina inglisianus (Stoliczka, 1871)
- Scabrina laciniata (Heude, 1885)
- Scabrina laotica Möllendorff, 1897
- Scabrina liratula (Preston, 1909)
- Scabrina locardi (J. Mabille, 1887)
- Scabrina moellendorffi Gredler, 1887
- Scabrina patera (L. Pfeiffer, 1854)
- Scabrina phaenotopicus (Benson, 1851)
- Scabrina pinnulifer (Benson, 1857)
- Scabrina thaitieni Thach, 2021
- Scabrina tonkiniana (J. Mabille, 1887)
- Scabrina vanbuensis (E. A. Smith, 1896)

Species brought into synonymy

- Scabrina microscopica (Morelet, 1881): synonym of Cyclophorus microscopicus Morelet, 1881 (unaccepted combination)
- Scabrina pinnulifera (Benson, 1857): synonym of Scabrina pinnulifer (Benson, 1857) (incorrect subsequent spelling)
