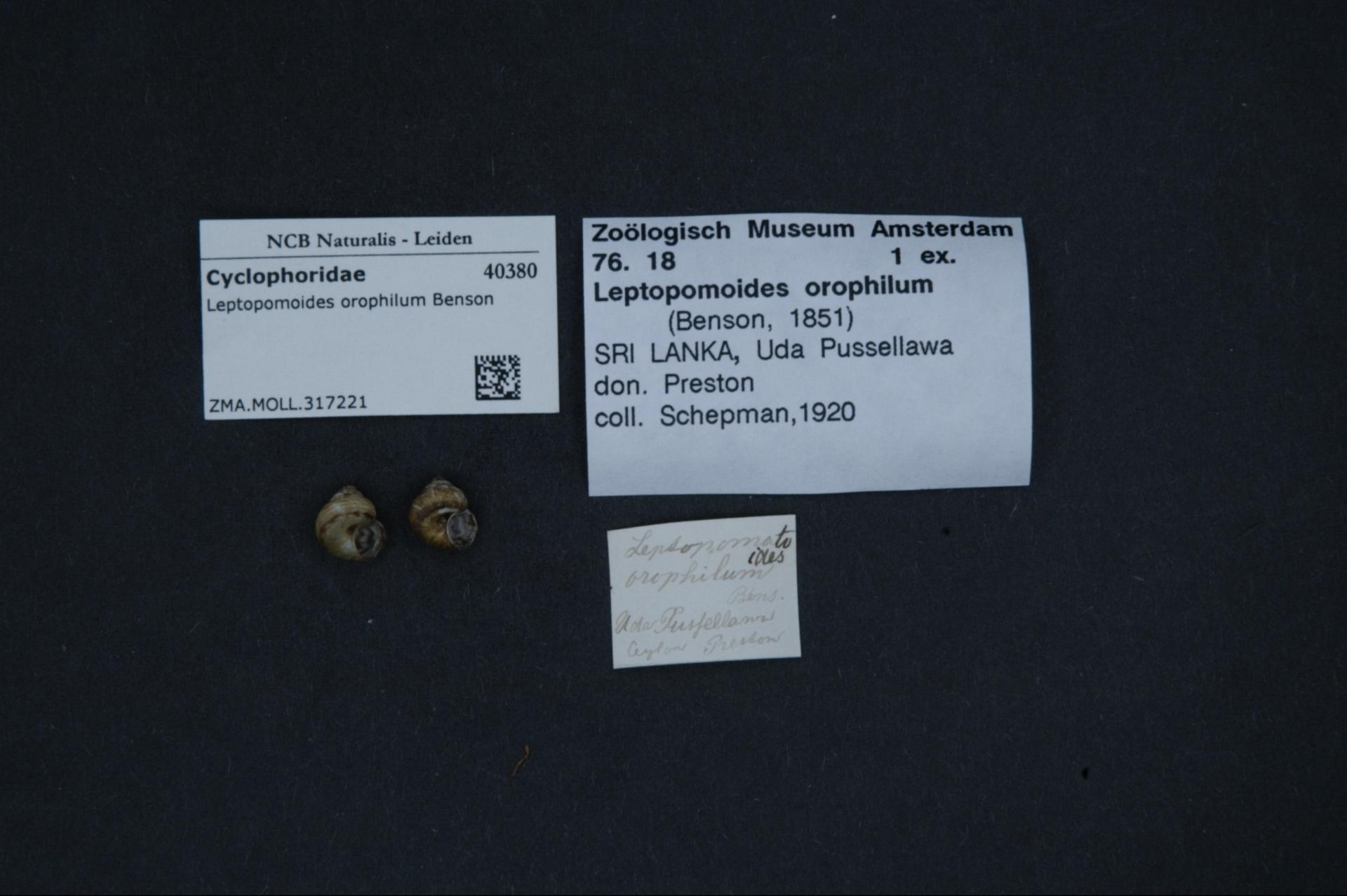
- Leptopomoides Orophilum Benson at the Natural Biodiversity Center

Scientific classification
- Kingdom: Animalia
- Phylum: Mollusca
- Class: Gastropoda
- Subclass: Caenogastropoda
- Order: Architaenioglossa
- Family: Cyclophoridae
- Subfamily: Cyclophorinae
- Genus: Leptopomoides; G. Nevill, 1878

Synonyms
- Cyclophorus (Leptopomoides) G. Nevill, 1878; Leptopomatoides Martens, 1878

= Leptopomoides =

Genus of gastropods

Leptopomoides is a genus of air-breathing land snails, terrestrial pulmonate gastropod mollusks in the family Cyclophoridae. These snails are located in Western Ghats of India and Sri Lanka.

Seven species are recognized.

== Species ==
- Leptopomoides conulus (Pfeiffer, 1855)
- Leptopomoides flammeus (Pfeiffer, 1855)
- Leptopomoides halophilus (W.H. Benson, 1851)
- Leptopomoides orophilus (W.H. Benson, 1853)
- Leptopomoides poecilus (Pfeiffer, 1855)
- Leptopomoides taprobanensis (Peston, 1909)
- Leptopomoides valvatus (O.F. von Möllendorff, 1897)
