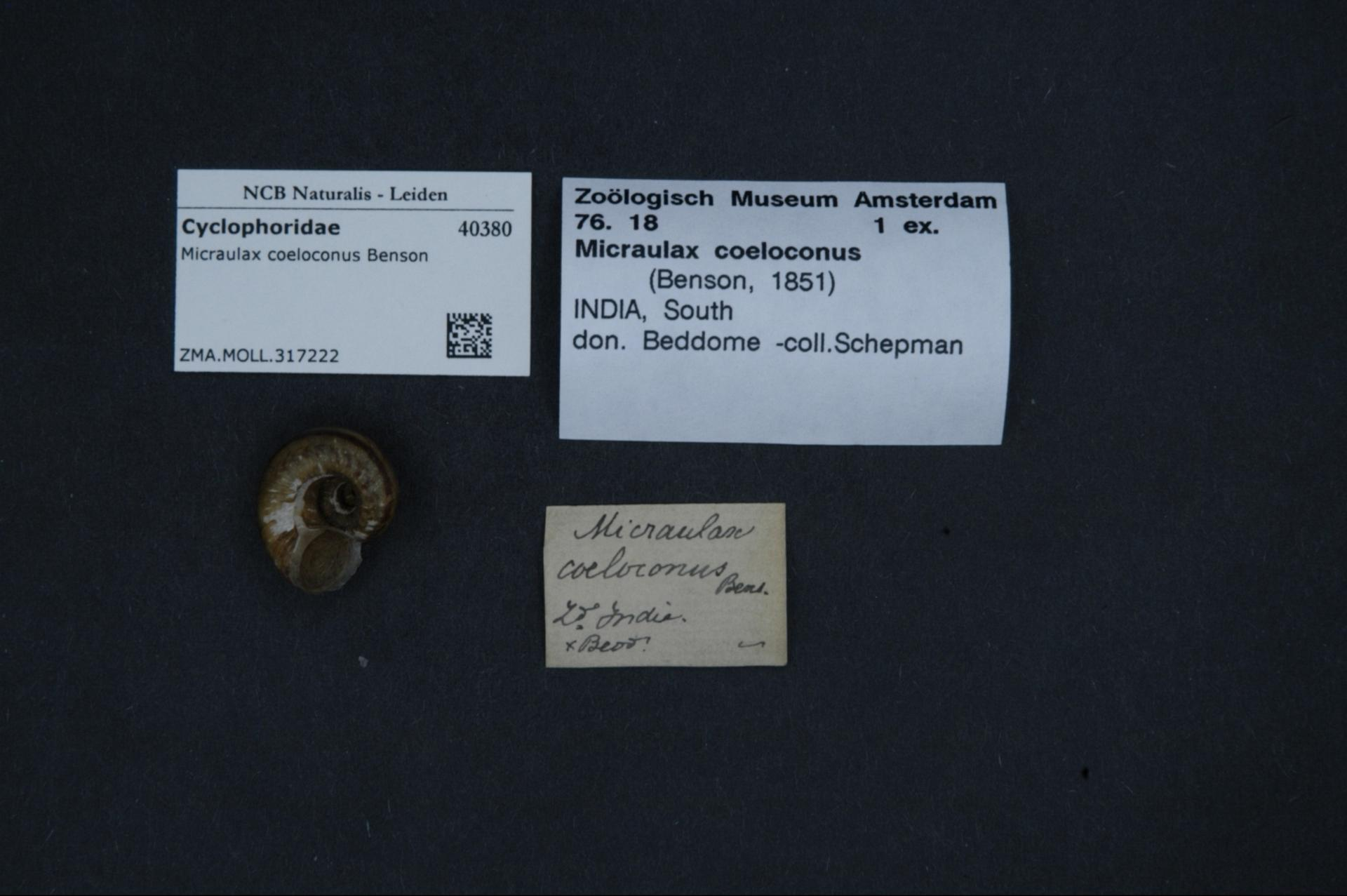

Scientific classification
- Kingdom: Animalia
- Phylum: Mollusca
- Class: Gastropoda
- Subclass: Caenogastropoda
- Order: Architaenioglossa
- Family: Cyclophoridae
- Genus: Micraulax; Theobald, 1876

= Micraulax =

Genus of gastropods

Micraulax is a genus of air-breathing land snails, terrestrial pulmonate gastropod mollusks in the family Cyclophoridae. These snails are restricted to Western Ghats of India and Sri Lanka.

Two species are recognized.

== Species ==
- Micraulax coeloconus (W.H. Benson, 1851)
- Micraulax scabra W. Theobald
