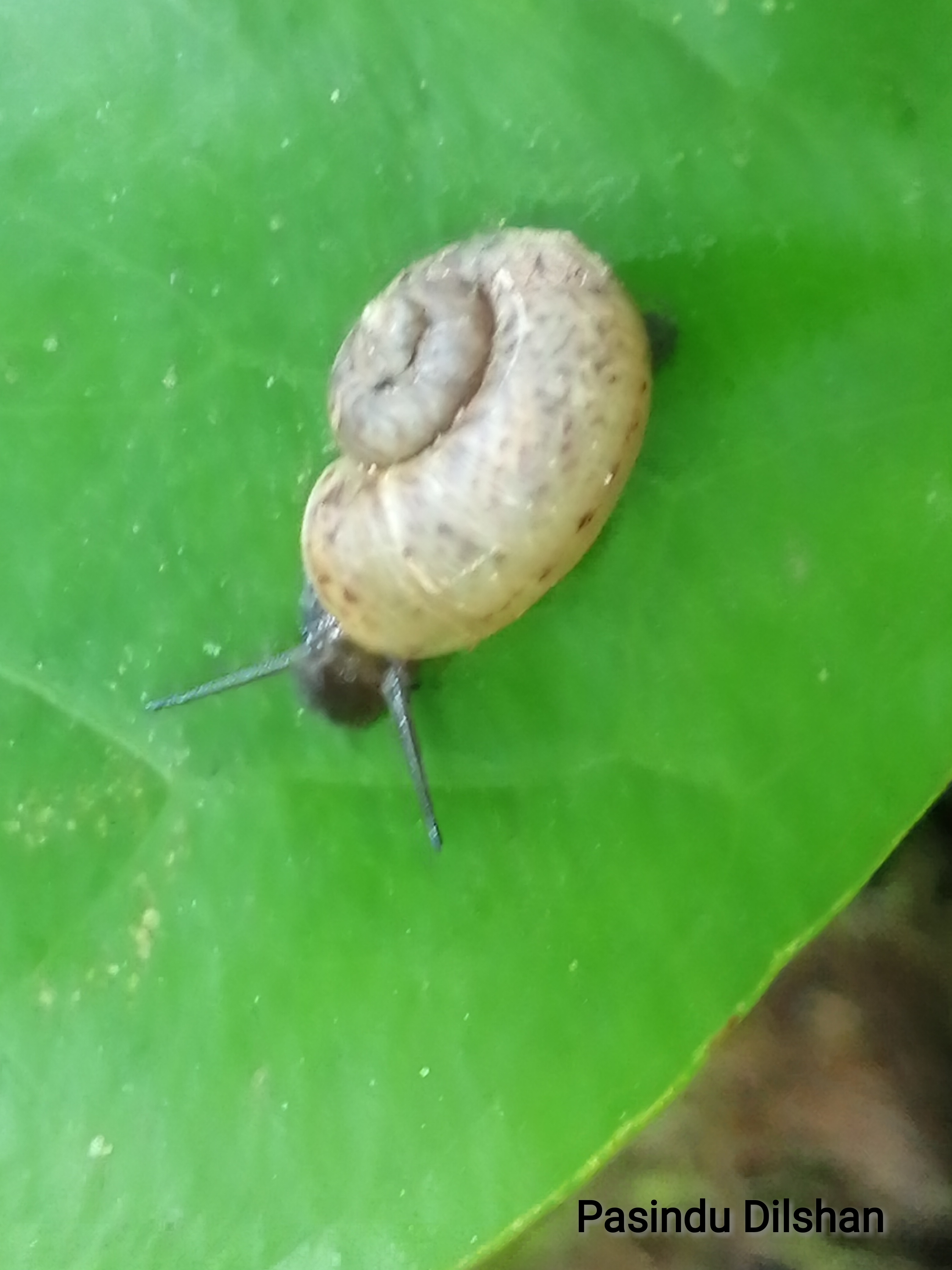
- Live specimen of Aulopoma helicinum

Scientific classification
- Kingdom: Animalia
- Phylum: Mollusca
- Class: Gastropoda
- Subclass: Caenogastropoda
- Order: Architaenioglossa
- Family: Cyclophoridae
- Subfamily: Cyclophorinae
- Genus: Aulopoma; Troschel, 1847

Type species
- Aulopoma hofmeisteri Troschel, 1847

Species
- 4 species

Synonyms
- Cyclostoma (Aulopoma) Troschel, 1847

= Aulopoma =

Genus of gastropods

Aulopoma is a genus of air-breathing land snails, terrestrial pulmonate gastropod mollusks in the family Cyclophoridae. They are endemic to Sri Lanka.

Four species are recognized.

== General characteristics ==
(Original description in German) The operculum perfectly resembles the shell of a Planorbis; it consists of many slowly widening whorls that enclose an internal spiral cavity. On the body whorl a circular groove runs inward, which receives the simple peristome (lip) of the shell. Consequently, the edge of the operculum overlaps the margin of the shell aperture like the lid of a jar. The simple peristome does not lean against the previous whorl — a necessary feature to allow the operculum to overlap — which provides a means of distinguishing this genus from other cyclostomids even in the absence of the operculum.

The shell of the single species upon which I establish this interesting genus was collected in Ceylon by my unfortunate friend Dr. Hofmeister, who sadly passed away during his travels. In memory of its discoverer, I name it A. hofmeisteri. It is flat, almost disc-shaped, with a slightly projecting, very pointed spire, deeply impressed sutures, and a wide umbilicus. It is yellowish in color with brown bands and markings. Its diameter is 8 mm.

(Description in German by Kobelt) The shell is low-turbinate to disc-shaped, with the body whorl detached at the front. The peristome (apertural margin) is free, straight, and continuous, fitting into a circular groove on the operculum. The operculum itself is not calcified and is slightly larger than the aperture; it is tightly coiled, planorbiform, and composed of two lamellae. Between these lamellae lies a spiral canal, while the outer edge features a groove designed to receive the peristome.

== Species ==
- Aulopoma grande Pfeiffer, 1855
- Aulopoma helicinum (Chemnitz, 1786)
- Aulopoma itierii Guérin-Méneville, 1847
- Aulopoma sphaeroideum Dohrn, 1857

Synonyms

- Aulopoma hofmeisteri Troschel, 1847 : synonym of Aulopoma itierii (Guérin-Méneville, 1847) (junior synonym)
- Aulopoma itieri (Guérin-Méneville, 1847): synonym of Aulopoma itierii (Guérin-Méneville, 1847) (incorrect subsequent spelling)
- Aulopoma lowi de Morgan, 1885 : synonym of Platyrhaphe lowi (de Morgan, 1885) (original combination)
