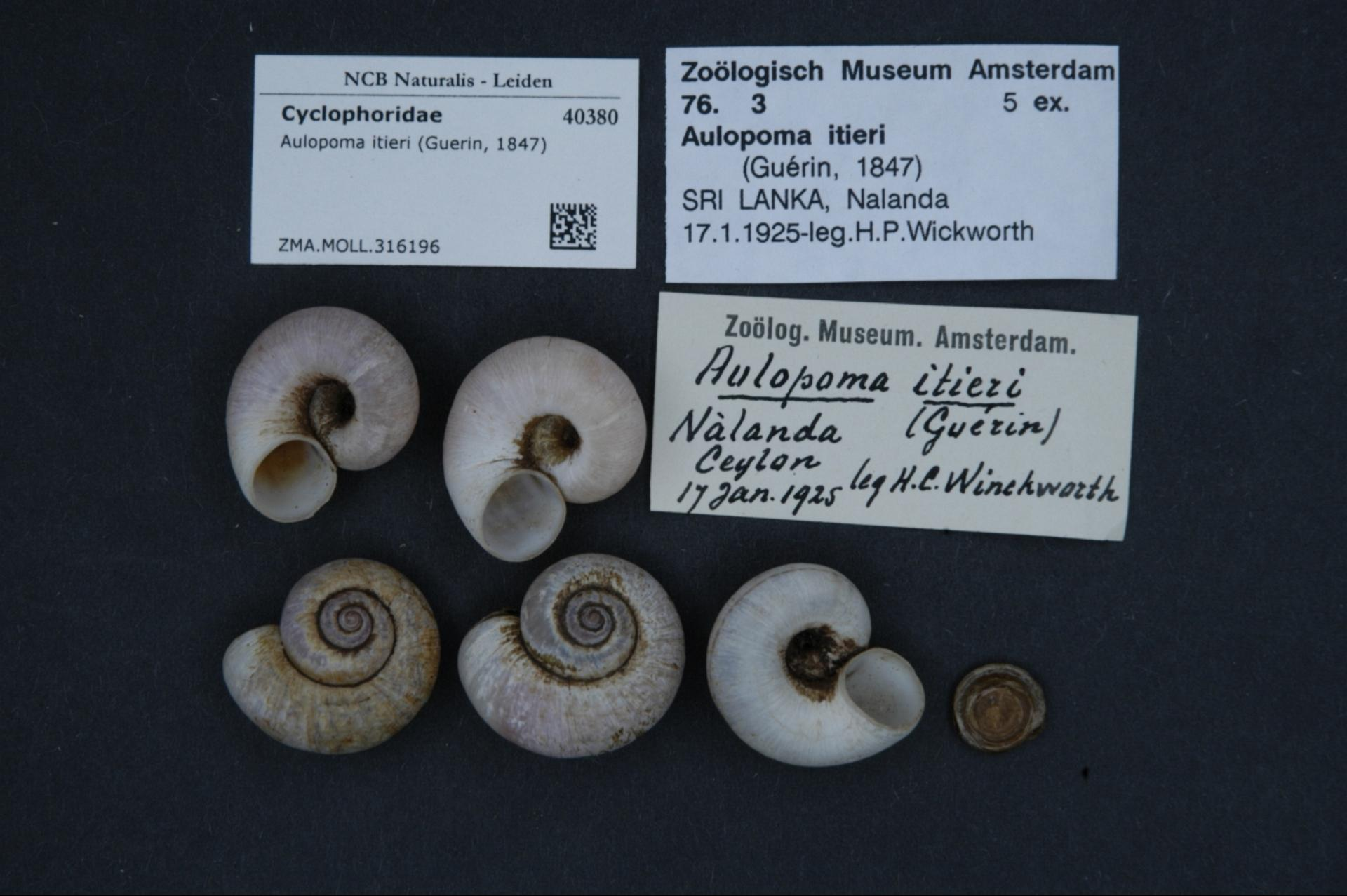
- Shell of Aulopoma itierii (specimen at Naturalis Biodiversity Centerà

Scientific classification
- Kingdom: Animalia
- Phylum: Mollusca
- Class: Gastropoda
- Subclass: Caenogastropoda
- Order: Architaenioglossa
- Family: Cyclophoridae
- Genus: Aulopoma
- Species: A. itierii

Binomial name
- Aulopoma itierii (Guérin-Méneville, 1847)

Synonyms
- Aulopoma hofmeisteri Troschel, 1847 (junior synonym); Aulopoma itieri (Guérin-Méneville, 1847) (incorrect subsequent spelling); Aulopoma itieri var. hofmeisteri Troschel, 1847 (junior synonym); Cyclostoma hoffmeisteri W. H. Benson, 1851 (misspelling of original name...); Cyclostoma itierii Guérin-Méneville, 1847 (original combination)

= Aulopoma itierii =

Species of gastropod

Aulopoma itierii is a species of small land snail with an operculum, terrestrial pulmonate gastropod mollusc in the family Cyclophoridae.

== Distribution ==
It is endemic to Sri Lanka.

== Description ==
It is about 11-22mm in length.

(Description in German by Kobelt) The height of the shell attains 11 mm, its diameter 22 : 18 mm

The shell is widely umbilicate, nearly disc-shaped, thick-walled, and striated. It is whitish in color, with the upper side mottled in chestnut brown; the periostracum is usually preserved and olive-brown in hue. The apex is needle-like and blue-black. There are 4 to 4 ½ cylindrical whorls. The body whorl is detached at the front and descends. The aperture is oblique and circular, with a peristome that is continuous, straight, and sharp. The operculum is quite thick and consists of 5 widely striated whorls.
