= Ditropopsis =

Scientific classification
- Domain: Eukaryota
- Kingdom: Animalia
- Phylum: Mollusca
- Class: Gastropoda
- Subclass: Caenogastropoda
- Order: Architaenioglossa
- Superfamily: Cyclophoroidea
- Family: Cyclophoridae
- Tribe: Cyclophorini
- Genus: Ditropopsis; E. A. Smith, 1897

Synonyms
- List: Cyclophorus (Ditropis) W. T. Blanford, 1869; Diaspira Soós, 1911; Ditropiphorus H. Fukuda, 2000; Ditropis W. T. Blanford, 1869; Ditropis (Ditropis) W. T. Blanford, 1869; Ditropis (Ditropopsis) E. A. Smith, 1897; Ditropopsis (Diaspira) Soós, 1911; Ditropopsis (Ditropiphorus) H. Fukuda, 2000; Ditropopsis (Ditropopsis) E. A. Smith, 1897

Genus of gastropods

Ditropopsis is a genus of small land snails with a gill and an operculum, terrestrial gastropod mollusks in the family Cyclophoridae.

== Distribution ==
Distribution of the genus Ditropopsis include New Guinea.

== Species ==
The following species are recognised in the genus Ditropopsis:

- Ditropopsis adesmospira (Möllendorff, 1895)
- Ditropopsis aenigmatica (van Benthem Jutting, 1963)
- Ditropopsis alta Greķe, 2014
- Ditropopsis beddomei (W. T. Blanford, 1869)
- Ditropopsis benthemjuttingae Greķe, 2011
- Ditropopsis biroi (Soós, 1911)
- Ditropopsis cavernae (Sykes, 1903)
- Ditropopsis cebuana (Möllendorff, 1890)
- Ditropopsis ciliata Greķe, 2017
- Ditropopsis cincta Vermeulen, T.-S. Liew & Schilthuizen, 2015
- Ditropopsis constricta Vermeulen, T.-S. Liew & Schilthuizen, 2015
- Ditropopsis conulina (Möllendorff, 1893)
- Ditropopsis convexus (W. T. Blanford, 1869)
- Ditropopsis corniculum (Möllendorff, 1893)
- Ditropopsis davisoni Vermeulen, T.-S. Liew & Schilthuizen, 2015
- Ditropopsis decollata (Möllendorff, 1893)
- Ditropopsis diminuta (Möllendorff, 1894)
- Ditropopsis everetti (E. A. Smith, 1895)
- Ditropopsis fruhstorferi (Möllendorff, 1897)
- Ditropopsis fultoni E. A. Smith, 1897
- Ditropopsis gradata (Quadras & Möllendorff, 1896)
- Ditropopsis halmaherica Greķe, 2014
- Ditropopsis heterospirifera (van Benthem Jutting, 1958)
- Ditropopsis imadatei (Habe, 1965)
- Ditropopsis ingenua (O. Boettger, 1891)
- Ditropopsis koperbergi (Zilch, 1955)
- Ditropopsis magna Greķe, 2014
- Ditropopsis majalibit Greķe, 2014
- Ditropopsis mira (Möllendorff, 1891)
- Ditropopsis mirabilis Greķe, 2011
- Ditropopsis moellendorffi (O. Boettger, 1891)
- Ditropopsis monticola Greķe, 2014
- Ditropopsis obiensis Greķe, 2011
- Ditropopsis pallidioperculata Greķe, 2014
- Ditropopsis papuana E. A. Smith, 1897
- Ditropopsis perlucidula Greķe, 2011
- Ditropopsis planorbis (W. T. Blanford, 1869)
- Ditropopsis pusilla (Quadras & Möllendorff, 1895)
- Ditropopsis pyramis Greķe, 2014
- Ditropopsis quadrasi (Möllendorff, 1890)
- Ditropopsis secunda (Möllendorff, 1890)
- Ditropopsis septentrionalis (Möllendorff, 1898)
- Ditropopsis spiralis (O. Boettger, 1891)
- Ditropopsis tamarau Greķe, 2014
- Ditropopsis telnovi Greķe, 2014
- Ditropopsis trachychilus Vermeulen, T.-S. Liew & Schilthuizen, 2015
- Ditropopsis tricarinatum (E. A. Smith, 1894)
- Ditropopsis tritonensis Greķe, 2011
- Ditropopsis tyloacron Vermeulen, T.-S. Liew & Schilthuizen, 2015
- Ditropopsis unicarinata Greķe, 2014
- Ditropopsis waigeoensis Greķe, 2014
- Ditropopsis wallacei Greķe, 2014
