= Spiraculum =

Scientific classification
- Domain: Eukaryota
- Kingdom: Animalia
- Phylum: Mollusca
- Class: Gastropoda
- Subclass: Caenogastropoda
- Order: Architaenioglossa
- Superfamily: Cyclophoroidea
- Family: Cyclophoridae
- Subfamily: Cyclophorinae
- Tribe: Pterocyclini
- Genus: Spiraculum; Pearson, 1833

Type species
- Spiraculum hispidum Pearson, 1833

Synonyms
- Diplopterum Möllendorff, 1897; Pearsonia Kobelt, 1902 (junior objective synonym of Spiraculum Pearson, 1833); Pearsonia (Pearsonia) Kobelt, 1902; Pearsonia (Pseudospiraculum) Kobelt, 1902; Pterocyclos (Spiraculum) Pearson, 1833 (unaccepted rank); Spiraculum (Pseudospiraculum) Kobelt, 1902 · alternate representation; Spiraculum (Spiraculum) Pearson, 1833 · alternate representation

Genus of gastropods

Spiraculum is a genus of operculate land snails in the subfamily Cyclophorinae of the family Cyclophoridae, native to parts of Asia.

== Species ==
- Spiraculum andersoni W. T. Blanford, 1869
- Spiraculum assamense Fulton, 1900
- Spiraculum avanum W. T. Blanford, 1863
- Spiraculum beddomei W. T. Blanford, 1866
- Spiraculum bhamoense Theobald, 1876
- Spiraculum bitubiferum Theobald, 1876
- Spiraculum fairbanki W. T. Blanford, 1869
- Spiraculum gredleri (Yen, 1939)
- Spiraculum hispidum Pearson, 1833
- Spiraculum huberi (Thach, 2016)
- Spiraculum kempi Godwin-Austen, 1915
- Spiraculum lamphunensis (S. Tumpeesuwan & C. Tumpeesuwan, 2015)
- Spiraculum luyorensis Godwin-Austen, 1915
- Spiraculum massiei Morlet, 1892
- Spiraculum mastersi W. T. Blanford, 1877
- Spiraculum minimum Godwin-Austen, 1915
- Spiraculum nagaense Godwin-Austen & Beddome, 1894
- Spiraculum nevilli Godwin-Austen, 1876
- Spiraculum oakesi Godwin-Austen, 1915
- Spiraculum parvum Pearson, 1833
- Spiraculum planum Godwin-Austen, 1915
- Spiraculum putaoensis Godwin-Austen, 1915
- Spiraculum regelspergeri (de Morgan, 1885)
- Spiraculum simplex (G. Nevill, 1878)
- Spiraculum tembatensis (Marzuki & Clements, 2013)
- Spiraculum travancoricum W. T. Blanford, 1881
- Spiraculum vilvensi (Thach & F. Huber, 2017)

Synonyms

- Spiraculum gordoni (Benson, 1863): synonym of Cyclotus gordoni (Benson, 1863) (unaccepted combination)
- Spiraculum grohi Thach & F. Huber, 2018: synonym of Cyclotus grohi (Thach & F. Huber, 2018) (original combination)
- Spiraculum harryleei Thach & F. Huber, 2018: synonym of Cyclotus harryleei (Thach & F. Huber, 2018) (original combination)
- Spiraculum thachi (F. Huber, 2017): synonym of Spiraculum huberi (Thach, 2016) (junior synonym)
- Spiraculum (Pseudospiraculum) Kobelt, 1902 represented as Spiraculum Pearson, 1833
- Spiraculum (Spiraculum) Pearson, 1833 represented as Spiraculum Pearson, 1833

Taxon inquirednum

- Spiraculum franzhuberi (Thach, 2017)
