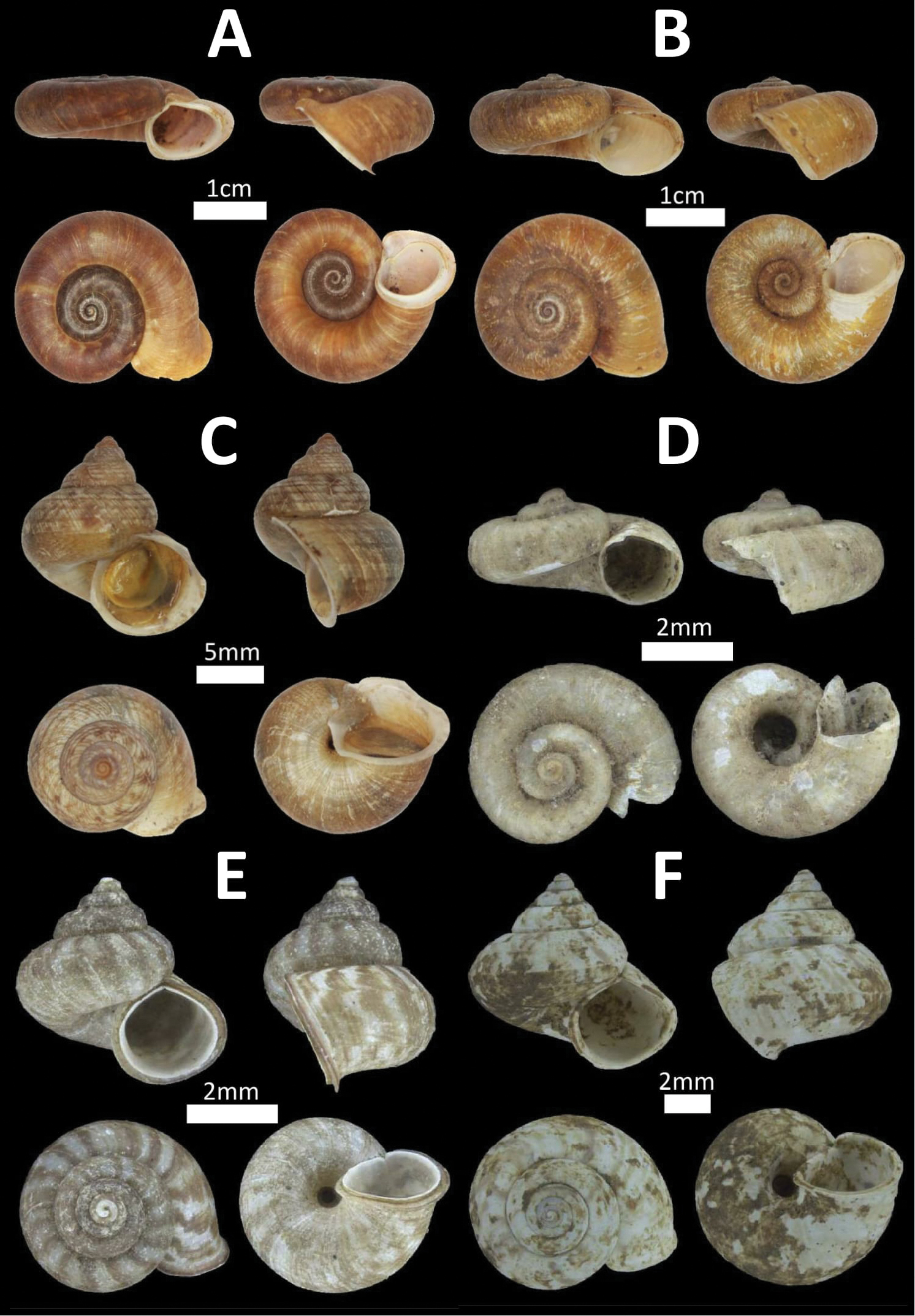
- Family Cyclophoridae. A Pterocyclos tenuilabiatus; B Pterocyclos amabilis C Leptopoma pellucidum; D Platyraphe bongaoensis; Broken aperture E Japonia trilirata/kinabaluensis species complex; F Japonia balabacensis

Scientific classification
- Kingdom: Animalia
- Phylum: Mollusca
- Class: Gastropoda
- Subclass: Caenogastropoda
- Order: Architaenioglossa
- Superfamily: Cyclophoroidea
- Family: Cyclophoridae; Gray, 1847

Subfamilies
- Alycaeinae; Cyclophorinae; Spirostomatinae

Synonyms
- Alycaeidae Blanford, 1864

= Cyclophoridae =

Cyclophoridae Temporal range: Cenomanian- Recent

Family of gastropods

Cyclophoridae is a taxonomic family of small to large tropical land snails with an operculum, terrestrial gastropod mollusks in the order Architaenioglossa belonging to the subclass Caenogastropoda (according to the taxonomy of the Gastropoda by Bouchet & Rocroi, 2005).

This diverse family with many species is now limited to the representatives in the tropics and subtropics of the Old and New World.

Their fossil history dates back through the Early Tertiary to the Cenomanian age of the Cretaceous.

== Description ==
The dextral shells are mostly of small and rarely medium size. The form of the shell varies from discoidal to turbinate. The round aperture is often modified, sometimes with an incision or a constriction. The last whorl can sometimes be disconnected and then extends strongly from the winding plane. The operculum is generally circular, which can be retracted deeply into the shell. Its form is multispiral and can be calcified or lacking calcareous overlay. The outer layer of the operculum can contain accessory deposits.

The head of the soft body ends in a short proboscis. The tentacles are round in cross-section, relatively long and taper to the end. The eyes are located at the base of the antenna on flat papillae. The longitudinal muscular foot is not divided. The mantle cavity acts as a lung cavity. The taenioglossan radula has seven elements per transverse row. The central row of the radula contains usually five, rarely three or seven teeth. The animals are dioecious.

== Taxonomy and systematics ==
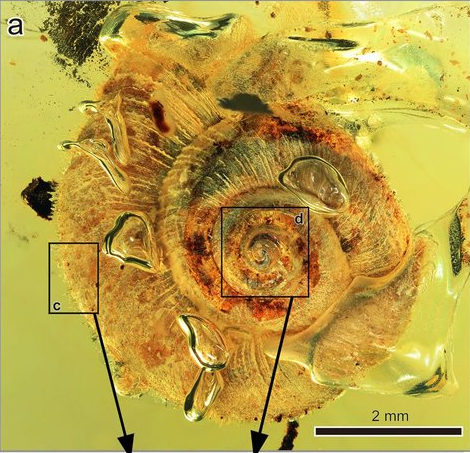
†Archaeocyclotus plicatula in Burmese amber

This family consists of the following subfamilies according to the taxonomy of the Gastropoda by Bouchet & Rocroi, 2005, which adapted the tribes of Cyclophorinae from the system used by Wenz (1938). Thirty five genera containing approximately 810 species have been recognized as in 2008.

Some notable genera are also listed here:

- Subfamily Cyclophoridae incertae sedis (taxon inquirendum)
  - Acroptychia Crosse & P. Fischer, 1877
  - Anosycolus Fischer-Piette, C.P. Blanc, F. Blanc & Salvat, 1993
  - † Archaeocyclotus Asato & Hirano in Hirano et al., 2019
  - Dominamaria Iredale, 1941
  - Ettemona Iredale, 1941
  - Hainesia L. Pfeiffer, 1856
  - † Hirsuticyclus Neubauer, Xing & Jochum, 2019
  - Madgeaconcha Griffiths & Florens, 2004
  - Naggsiaconcha Griffiths & Florens, 2004
  - Nobuea Kuroda & Miyanaga, 1943
  - † Palaeocyclophorus Wenz, 1923
  - † Tropidogyra Wenz, 1923
  - Ventriculus Wenz in Fischer & Wenz, 1914
  - Cyclophorus incertae sedis (temporary name)
- Subfamily Alycaeinae Blanford, 1864: raised to the rank of family Alycaeidae in 2020
- Subfamily Cyclophorinae Gray, 1847
  - Genus Aulopoma Troschel, 1847
  - Tribe Caspicyclotini Wenz, 1938
    - Caspicyclotus Forcart, 1935
  - Tribe Cyathopomatini Kobelt & Möllendorff, 1897
    - Cyathopoma Blanford & Blanford, 1861
    - † Mazzinia Oppenheim, 1895
    - Mychopoma Blanford, 1869
    - Jerdonia Blanford & Blanford, 1861: synonym of Cyathopoma W. T. Blanford & H. F. Blanford, 1861
    - Pseudojerdonia Kobelt, 1902: synonym of Cyathopoma (Pseudojerdonia) Kobelt, 1902 represented as Cyathopoma W. T. Blanford & H. F. Blanford, 1861 (unaccepted rank)
  - Tribe Cyclophorini Gray, 1847
    - Afroditropis Bequaert & Clench, 1936
    - Craspedotropis Blanford, 1864
    - Crossopoma von Martens, 1891
    - Cyclophorus Montfort, 1810
    - Cyclosurus Morelet, 1881
    - Ditropopsis Smith, 1897
    - Elgonocyclus Verdcourt, 1982
    - Japonia Gould, 1859
    - Lagocheilus Blanford, 1864
    - Leptopoma Pfeiffer, 1847
    - Leptopomoides Nevill, 1878
    - Micraulax Theobald, 1876
    - Montanopoma Stanisic, 2010
    - Myxostoma Troschel, 1847
    - Otopoma Gray, 1850
    - Owengriffithsius Emberton, 2002
    - Papuocyclus Ancey, 1895
    - Pilosphaera Lee, Lue & Wu, 2008
    - Ptychopoma Möllendorff, 1885
    - Scabrina Blanford, 1863
    - Theobaldius Nevill, 1878
  - Tribe Cyclotini Pfeiffer, 1853
    - Afrocyclus Cole, 2019
    - Cyclotus Swainson, 1840
    - Eucyclotus Möllendorff, 1890
    - Nakadaella Ancey, 1904
    - Opisthoporus Benson, 1851
    - Platyrhaphe Möllendorff, 1890
    - Speleocyclotus Vermeulen, Luu, Theary & Anker, 2019
  - Genus Pholeoteras Sturany, 1904
  - Tribe Pterocyclini Kobelt & Möllendorff, 1897
    - Millotorbis Fischer-Piette & Bedoucha, 1965
    - Pterocyclos Benson, 1832
    - Rhiostoma Benson, 1860
    - Spiraculum Pearson, 1833
  - Genus † Eotrichophorus D. A. Bullis, Herhold, Czekanski-Moir, Grimaldi & Rundell, 2020
- Subfamily † Ferussininae Wenz, 1923 (1915)
  - † Ferussina Grateloup, 1827
- Subfamily Spirostomatinae Tielecke, 1940
    - Spirostoma Heude, 1885
- Subfamily Spirostomatinae Tielecke, 1940
  - Spirostoma Heude, 1885
- Genus † Trotopyrgula X.-H. Yu, 1987

== Sources ==
- Kobelt, W. (1909). Cyclophoridae. Berlin: Verlag von R. Friedländer und Sohn. The standard reference based on shell morphology.
- Nantarat, N., Sutcharit, C., Tongkerd, P., Ablett, J., Naggs, F. & Panha, S. (2014). An annotated catalogue of type specimens of the land snail genus Cyclophorus Monfort, 1810 (Caenogastropoda, Cyclophoridae) in the Natural History Museum, London. ZooKeys, 411, 1–56.
