= Schistosoma spindale =

Scientific classification
- Domain: Eukaryota
- Kingdom: Animalia
- Phylum: Platyhelminthes
- Class: Trematoda
- Order: Diplostomida
- Family: Schistosomatidae
- Genus: Schistosoma
- Species: S. spindale

Binomial name
- Schistosoma spindale (Montgomery, 1906)

Species of fluke

Schistosoma spindale is a species of digenetic trematode in the family Schistosomatidae. It causes intestinal schistosomiasis in the ruminants.

The distribution of Schistosoma spindale includes Sri Lanka, India, Bangladesh, Thailand, Malaysia, and Laos.

The tegument of Schistosoma spindale under scanning electron microscope was studied in 1983. It is non-tuberculated.

The first intermediate host is a freshwater snail Indoplanorbis exustus that may be the sole natural intermediate host for Schistosoma spindale (and other two Schistosoma species) on the Indian sub-continent. One snail can produce up to 7,000 cercariae in one day.

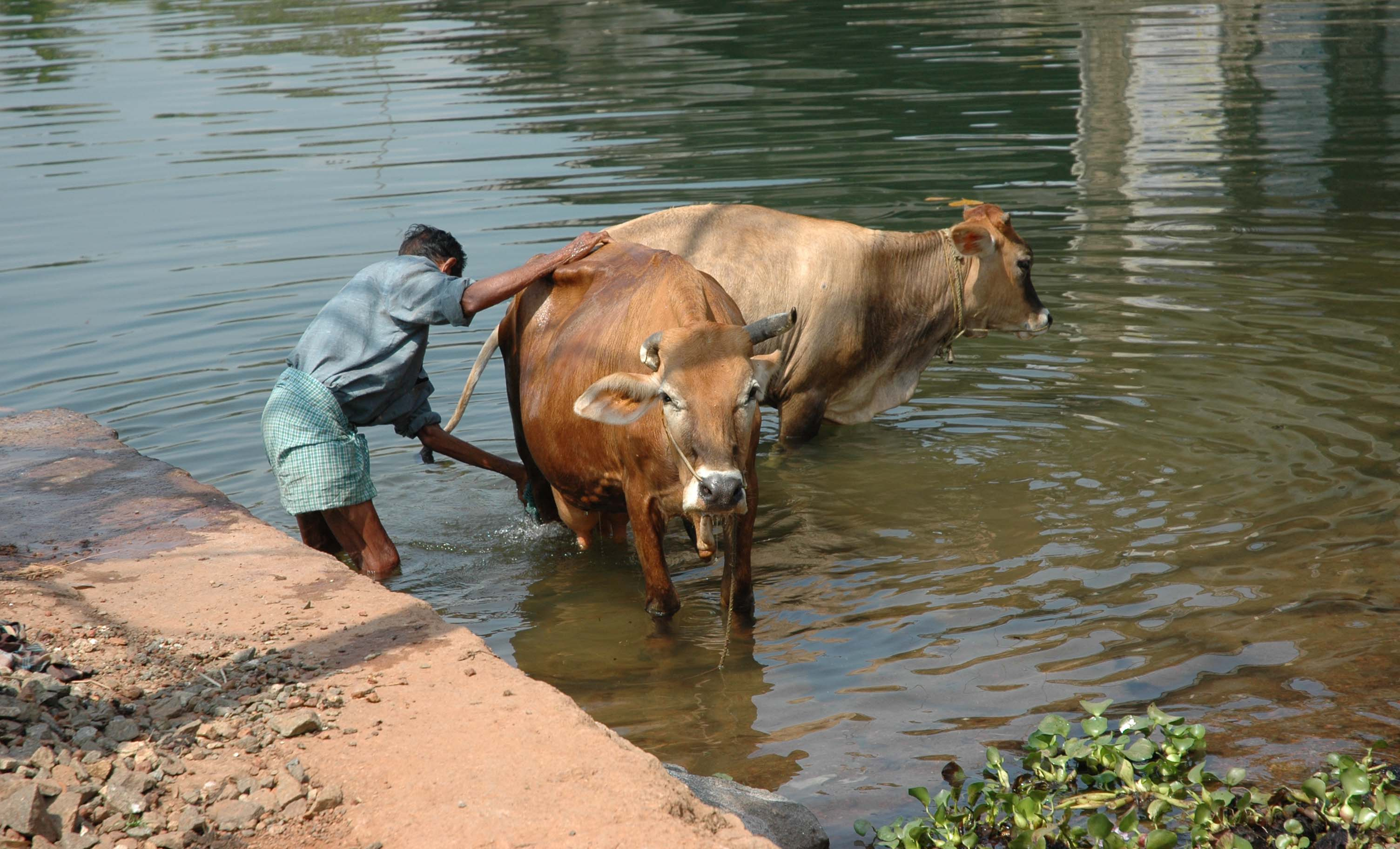
Cercariae can infect cattle in water environment.

The cercariae usually infect some hairy host (low host specificity) in shallow and muddy waters.

The definitive hosts of Schistosoma spindale are (mainly) ruminants and Schistosoma spindale cause intestinal schistosomiasis of ruminants (Artiodactyla, Ruminantia). Surveillance for cattle schistosomiasis is generally inadequate and the literature is limited, but some idea of the problem can be gained from past small scale studies. For a diagnosis there is need to find eggs of Schistosoma spindale in feces. Surveys in Sri Lanka revealed prevalence of Schistosoma spindale of 31.2% (of 901 cattle), whilst in Bangladesh a similarly high prevalence of 36% has been reported. More recently, in Kerala South India, prevalences have been reported up to 57.3% in cattle, 50% in water buffalo (Bubalus bubalis) and 4.7% in goats. The prevalence of Schistosoma spindale in the animals depends on the diagnostic test employed. Thus, it was as low as 10–30% by faecal examination (again low if egg detection method is employed and high if hatching method is followed) with as high as 80–95% by examining mesentery of the animals for live schistosomes during post mortem. Schistosoma spindale was found causing an outbreak in cattle in Maharashtra leading to heavy mortality with symptoms similar to Rinder pest.

Other hosts of Schistosoma spindale include:

- Bandicota indica
- Rattus argentiventer
- Rattus rattus diardii
- Rattus tiomanicus jalorensis

Schistosoma spindale has been implicated of human cercarial dermatitis in India and in Malaysia.

== Cladogram ==
A cladogram based on 18S ribosomal RNA, 28S ribosomal RNA, and partial cytochrome-c oxidase I (COI) genes shows phylogenic relations of species in the genus Schistosoma:

- - - - - - - - - - - - Schistosoma curassoni
                      - Schistosoma intercalatum
                    - Schistosoma bovis
                  - - Schistosoma leiperi
                    - Schistosoma mattheei
                - Schistosoma haematobium
              - Schistosoma margrebowiei
            - - - Schistosoma spindale
                - Schistosoma indicum
              - Schistosoma nasale
          - - Schistosoma mansoni
            - Schistosoma rodhaini
        - Schistosoma incognitum
      - Orientobilharzia turkestanicum
    - - Schistosoma edwardiense
      - Schistosoma sp. from Ceratophallus natalensis
  - - - - Schistosoma mekongi
        - Schistosoma malayensis
      - Schistosoma japonicum
    - Schistosoma sinensium
