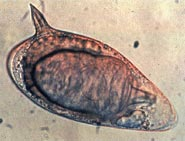
- Schistosoma mansoni egg

Scientific classification
- Kingdom: Animalia
- Phylum: Platyhelminthes
- Class: Trematoda
- Order: Diplostomida
- Family: Schistosomatidae
- Subfamily: Schistosomatinae
- Genus: Schistosoma; Weinland, 1858

Species
- Schistosoma bomfordi Schistosoma bovis Schistosoma curassoni Schistosoma datta Schistosoma edwardiense Schistosoma guineensis Schistosoma haematobium Schistosoma harinasutai Schistosoma hippopotami Schistosoma incognitum Schistosoma indicum Schistosoma intercalatum Schistosoma japonicum Schistosoma kisumuensis Schistosoma leiperi Schistosoma malayensis Schistosoma mansoni Schistosoma margrebowiei Schistosoma mattheei Schistosoma mekongi Schistosoma ovuncatum Schistosoma nasale Schistosoma rodhaini Schistosoma sinensium Schistosoma spindale Schistosoma turkestanicum

= Schistosoma =

Genus of flukes

Schistosoma is a genus of trematodes, commonly known as blood flukes. They are parasitic flatworms responsible for a highly significant group of infections in humans termed schistosomiasis, which is considered by the World Health Organization to be the second-most socioeconomically devastating parasitic disease (after malaria), infecting millions worldwide.

Adult flatworms parasitize blood capillaries of either the mesenteries or plexus of the bladder, depending on the infecting species. They are unique among trematodes and any other flatworms in that they are dioecious with distinct sexual dimorphism between male and female. Thousands of eggs are released and reach either the bladder or the intestine (according to the infecting species), and these are then excreted in urine or feces to fresh water. Larvae must then pass through an intermediate snail host before the next larval stage of the parasite emerges that can infect a new mammalian host by penetrating the skin.

== Evolution ==
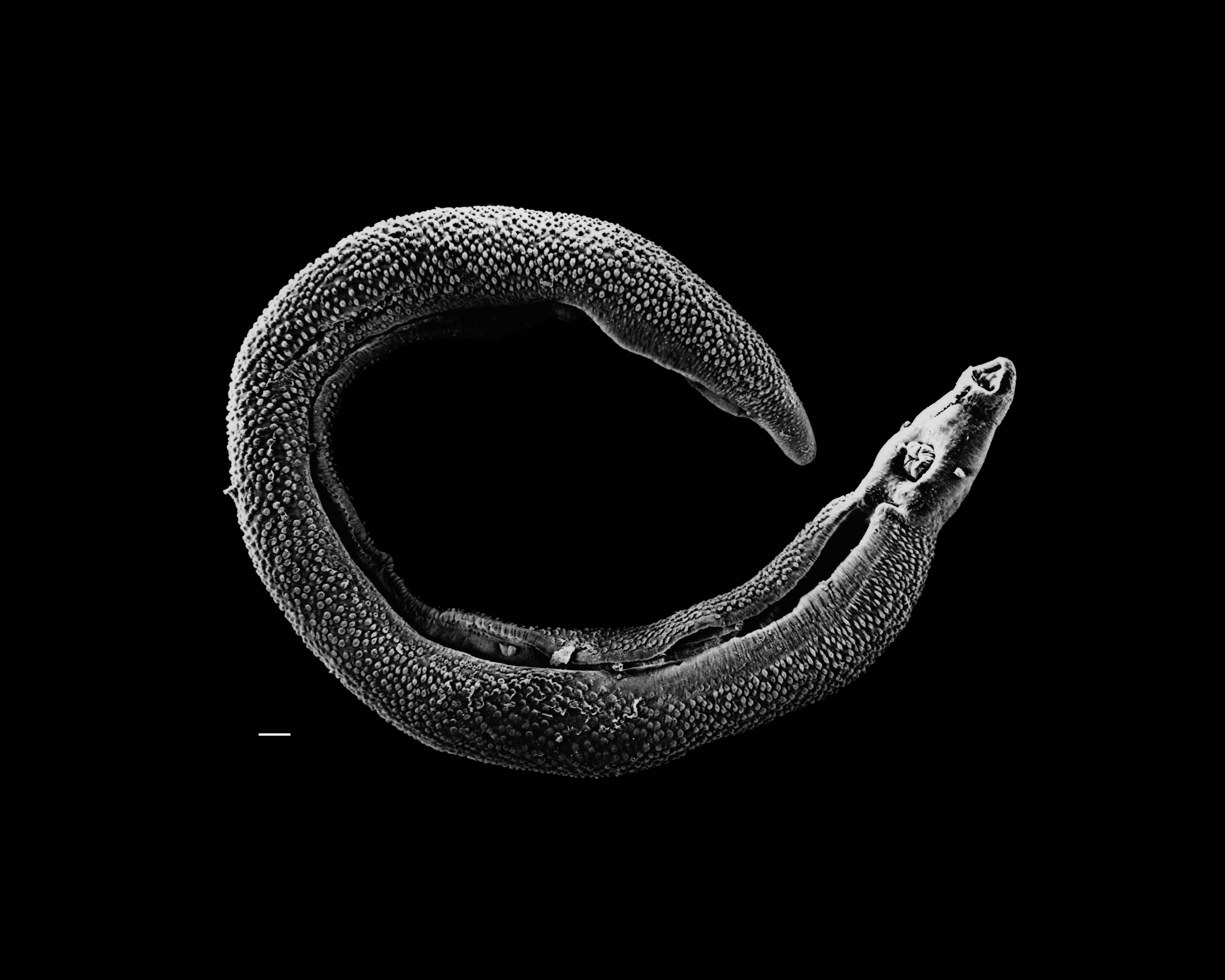
Electron micrograph of an adult male Schistosoma parasite worm. The bar (bottom left) represents a length of 500 μm.

The origins of this genus remain unclear. For many years it was believed that this genus had an African origin, but DNA sequencing suggests that the species (S. edwardiense and S. hippopotami) that infect the hippo (Hippopotamus amphibius) could be basal. Since hippos were present in both Africa and Asia during the Cenozoic era, the genus might have originated as parasites of hippos. The original hosts for the South East Asian species were probably rodents.

Based on the phylogenetics of the host snails it seems likely that the genus evolved in Gondwana between 150 million years ago.S. indicum and S. Jaonicum arose from Asian ancestors after the continental drift, approximately 80 to 184 million years ago. Subsuquent African ancestors of remaining Schistosoma species spread throughout Africa around 120 million years ago.

The sister group to Schistosoma is a genus of elephant-infecting schistosomes — Bivitellobilharzia.

The cattle, sheep, goat and cashmere goat parasite Orientobilharzia turkestanicum appears to be related to the African schistosomes. This latter species has since been transferred to the genus Schistosoma.

Within the haematobium group S. bovis and S. curassoni appear to be closely related as do S. leiperi and S. mattheei.

S. mansoni appears to have evolved in East Africa 0.43–0.30 million years ago.

S. mansoni and S. rodhaini appear to have shared a common ancestor between 107.5 and 147.6 thousand years ago. This period overlaps with the earliest archaeological evidence for fishing in Africa. It appears that S. mansoni originated in East Africa and experienced a decline in effective population size 20-90 thousand years ago before dispersing across the continent during the Holocene. This species was later transmitted to the Americas by the slave trade.

S. incognitum and S. nasale are more closely related to the African species rather than the japonicum group.

S. sinensium appears to have radiated during the Pliocene.

S. mekongi appears to have invaded South East Asia in the mid-Pleistocene.

Estimated speciation dates for the japonicum group: ~3.8 million years ago for S. japonicum/South East Asian schistosoma and ~2.5 million years ago for S. malayensis/S. mekongi.

Schistosoma turkestanicum is found infecting red deer in Hungary. These strains appear to have diverged from those found in China and Iran. The date of divergence appears to be 270,000 years before present.

== Taxonomy ==
The genus Schistosoma as currently defined is paraphyletic, so revisions are likely. Over twenty species are recognised within this genus.

The genus has been divided into four groups: indicum, japonicum, haematobium and mansoni. The affinities of the remaining species are still being clarified.

Thirteen species are found in Africa. Twelve of these are divided into two groups—those with a lateral spine on the egg (mansoni group) and those with a terminal spine (haematobium group).

=== Mansoni group ===
The four mansoni group species are: S. edwardiense, S. hippotami, S. mansoni and S. rodhaini.

=== Haematobium group ===
The nine haematobium group species are: S. bovis, S. curassoni, S. guineensis, S. haematobium, S. intercalatum, S. kisumuensis, S. leiperi, S. margrebowiei and S. mattheei.

S. leiperi and S. matthei appear to be related. S. margrebowiei is basal in this group. S. guineensis is the sister species to the S. bovis and S. curassoni grouping. S. intercalatum may actually be a species complex of at least two species.

=== Indicum group ===
The indicum group has three species: S. indicum, S. nasale and S. spindale. This group appears to have evolved during the Pleistocene. All use pulmonate snails as hosts. S. spindale is widely distributed in Asia, Africa, and India..

S. indicum is found in India and Thailand.

The indicum group appears to be the sister clade to the African species.

=== Japonicum group ===
The japonicum group has five species: S. japonicum, S. malayensis and S. mekongi, S. ovuncatum and S. sinensium and these species are found in China and Southeast Asia.

S. ovuncatum forms a clade with S. sinensium and is found in northern Thailand. The definitive host is unknown and the intermediate host is the snail Tricula bollingi. This species is known to use snails of the family Pomatiopsidae as hosts.

S. incognitum appears to be basal in this genus. It may be more closely related to the African-Indian species than to the Southeast Asian group. This species uses pulmonate snails as hosts. Examination of the mitochondria suggests that Schistosoma incognitum may be a species complex.

=== New species ===
As of 2012, four additional species have been transferred to this genus., previously classified as species in the genus Orientobilharzia. Orientobilharzia differs from Schistosoma morphologically only on the basis of the number of testes. A review of the morphological and molecular data has shown that the differences between these genera are too small to justify their separation. The four species are

- Schistosoma bomfordi
- Schistosoma datta
- Schistosoma harinasutai
- Schistosoma turkestanicum

=== Hybrids ===
The hybrid S. haematobium-S.guineenis was observed in Cameroon in 1996. S. haematobium could establish itself only after deforestation of the tropical rainforest in Loum next to the endemic S. guineensis; hybridization led to competitive exclusion of S. guineensis.

In 2003, a S. mansoni-S. rodhaini hybrid was found in snails in western Kenya, As of 2009, it had not been found in humans.

In 2009, S. haematobium–S. bovis hybrids were described in northern Senegalese children. The Senegal River Basin had changed very much since the 1980s after the Diama Dam in Senegal and the Manantali Dam in Mali had been built. The Diama dam prevented ocean water to enter and allowed new forms of agriculture. Human migration, increasing number of livestock and sites where human and cattle both contaminate the water facilitated mixing between the different schistosomes in N'Der, for example. The same hybrid was identified during the 2015 investigation of a schistosomiasis outbreak on Corsica, traced to the Cavu river.

In 2019, a S. haematobium–S. mansoni hybrid was described in a 14-year-old patient with hematuria from Côte d'Ivoire.

=== Cladogram ===
A cladogram based on 18S ribosomal RNA, 28S ribosomal RNA, and partial cytochrome c oxidase subunit I (COI) genes shows phylogenic relations of species in the genus Schistosoma:

- - - - - - - - - - - - Schistosoma curassoni
                      - Schistosoma intercalatum
                    - Schistosoma bovis
                  - - Schistosoma leiperi
                    - Schistosoma mattheei
                - Schistosoma haematobium
              - Schistosoma margrebowiei
            - - - Schistosoma spindale
                - Schistosoma indicum
              - Schistosoma nasale
          - - Schistosoma mansoni
            - Schistosoma rodhaini
        - Schistosoma incognitum
      - Schistosoma turkestanicum
    - - Schistosoma edwardiense
      - Schistosoma sp. from Ceratophallus natalensis
  - - - - Schistosoma mekongi
        - Schistosoma malayensis
      - Schistosoma japonicum
    - - Schistosoma sinensium
      - Schistosoma ovuncatum

== Comparison of eggs ==
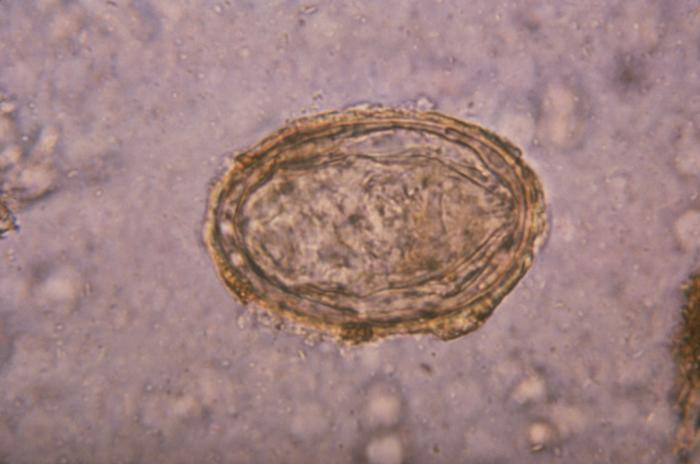
Schistosoma japonicum

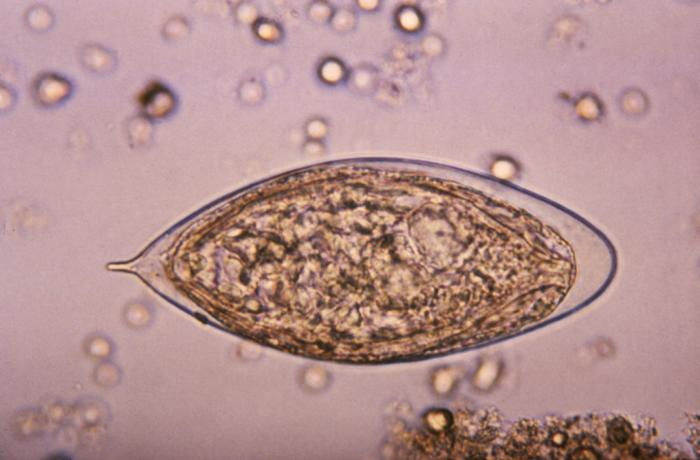
Schistosoma haematobium

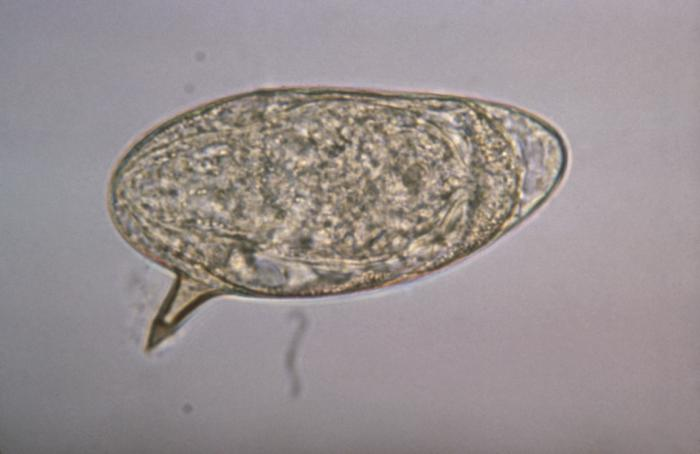
Schistosoma mansoni

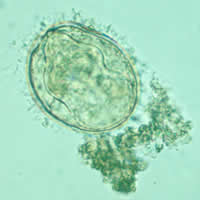
Schistosoma mekongi

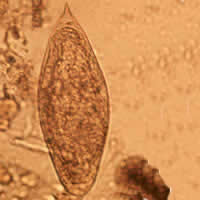
Schistosoma intercalatum

== Geographical distribution ==
Geographical areas associated with schistosomiasis by the World Health Organization as of January 2017 include in alphabetical order: Africa, Brazil, Cambodia, the Caribbean, China, Corsica, Indonesia, Laos, the Middle East, the Philippines, Suriname, and Venezuela. There had been no cases in Europe since 1965, until an outbreak occurred on Corsica.

The distribution of schistosoma, particularly in regions of freshwater communities of Africa is linked to prevalence of their main host, Bulinus snails. The B. jousseaumei sub-spies is found in parts of West Africa, and the B. globosus in parts of Northern Africa. These snails are typically found in freshwater season pools, but can be carried through irrigation of rice fields. Sampling was collected during dry seasons, as flooding and high rain typically lower the level of snail population. The prevalence of schistosoma, and subsequently schistomiasis, in freshwater communities of Northern Africa is approximately 8.7%, but is typically higher in female over male participants of studies (9.4% as opposed to 8.1%). Studies from 2022 also show linkage between high populations in freshwater communities to higher levels of transmission and population of certain species of schistosoma.

== Schistosomiasis ==
The parasitic flatworms of Schistosoma cause a group of chronic infections called schistosomiasis known also as bilharziasis. An anti-schistosome drug is a schistosomicide.

=== Species infecting humans ===
Parasitism of humans by Schistosoma appears to have evolved on at least three occasions in both Asia and Africa.

- S. guineensis, a recently described species, is found in West Africa. Known snail intermediate hosts include Bulinus forskalii.
- S. haematobium, commonly referred to as the bladder fluke, originally found in Africa, the Near East, and the Mediterranean basin, was introduced into India during World War II. Freshwater snails of the genus Bulinus are an important intermediate host for this parasite. Among final hosts, humans are most important. Other final hosts are rarely baboons and monkeys.
- S. intercalatum. The usual final hosts are humans. Other animals can be infected experimentally.
- S. japonicum, whose common name is simply blood fluke, is widespread in East Asia and the southwestern Pacific region. Freshwater snails of the genus Oncomelania are an important intermediate host for S. japonicum. Final hosts are humans and other mammals including cats, dogs, goats, horses, pigs, rats and water buffalo.
- S. malayensis. This species appears to be a rare infection in humans and is considered to be a zoonosis. The natural vertebrate host is Müller's giant Sunda rat (Sundamys muelleri). The snail hosts are Robertsiella species (R. gismanni, R. kaporensis and R. silvicola.
- S. mansoni, found in Africa, Brazil, Venezuela, Suriname, the lesser Antilles, Puerto Rico, and the Dominican Republic. It is also known as Manson's blood fluke or swamp fever. Freshwater snails of the genus Biomphalaria are an important intermediate host for this trematode. Among final hosts humans are most important. Other final hosts are baboons, rodents and raccoons.
- S. mekongi is related to S. japonicum and affects both the superior and inferior mesenteric veins. S. mekongi differs in that it has smaller eggs, a different intermediate host (Neotricula aperta) and longer prepatent period in the mammalian host. Its final hosts are humans and dogs. The snail Neotricula aperta can also be experimentally infected with this species.

Human Schistosomes
Scientific Name	First Intermediate Host	Endemic Area
Schistosoma guineensis	Bulinus forskalii	West Africa
Schistosoma intercalatum	Bulinus spp	Africa
Schistosoma haematobium	Bulinus spp.	Africa, Middle East
Schistosoma japonicum	Oncomelania spp.	China, East Asia, Philippines
Schistosoma malayensis	Robertsiella spp.	Southeast Asia
Schistosoma mansoni	Biomphalaria spp.	Africa, South America, Caribbean, Middle East
Schistosoma mekongi	Neotricula aperta	Southeast Asia

=== Species infecting other animals ===
- Schistosoma indicum, Schistosoma nasale, Schistosoma spindale, Schistosoma leiperi are all parasites of ruminants.
- Schistosoma edwardiense and Schistosoma hippopotami are parasites of the hippo.
- Schistosoma ovuncatum and Schistosoma sinensium are parasites of rodents.

== Treatment ==
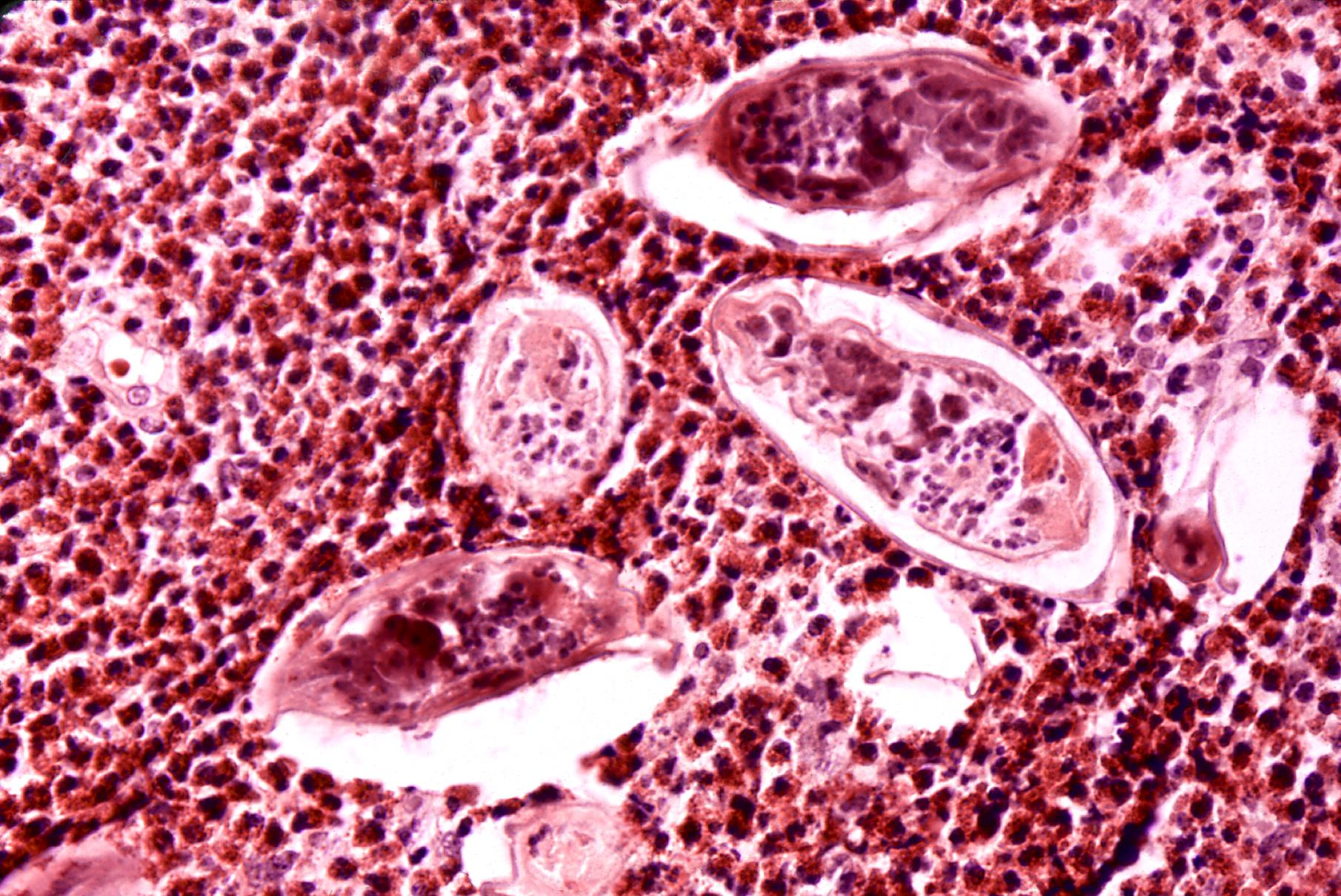
Schistosoma haematobium eggs in bladder tissue, surrounded by inflammatory cells.

=== Infected humans ===
Schistosomiasis is a parasitic disease caused by infection with Schistosoma species. Some infected individuals may develop symptoms such as abdominal pain, diarrhea, and blood in their urine or stool. Long term infections can cause serious complications, including liver damage, bladder problems, and other organ damage. Praziqantel is the main medication used to treat schistosomiasis. In areas where the disease is common, public health programs use mass drug administration to provide treatment to populations at risk. These programs help reduce the severity of infections and prevent long term complications.

=== Infected animals ===
Schistosomiasis in animals such as cattle and water buffaloes can be treated with praziquantel. A study conducted in China found that praziquantel treatment was 97% effective against Schistosoma japonicum infections in these animals. However, reinfection occurred throughout the year, suggesting that treatment alone may not be enough to control the disease. These findings highlight the importance of combining veterinary treatment with other measures to reduce parasite transmission in environments where livestock are exposed to infected freshwater.

== Morphology ==
Adult schistosomes share all the fundamental features of the digenea. They have a basic bilateral symmetry, oral and ventral suckers, a body covering of a syncytial tegument, a blind-ending digestive system consisting of mouth, esophagus and bifurcated caeca; the area between the tegument and alimentary canal filled with a loose network of mesoderm cells, and an excretory or osmoregulatory system based on flame cells. Adult worms tend to be 10–20 mm (0.39–0.79 in) long and use globins from their hosts' hemoglobin for their own circulatory system.

== Reproduction ==
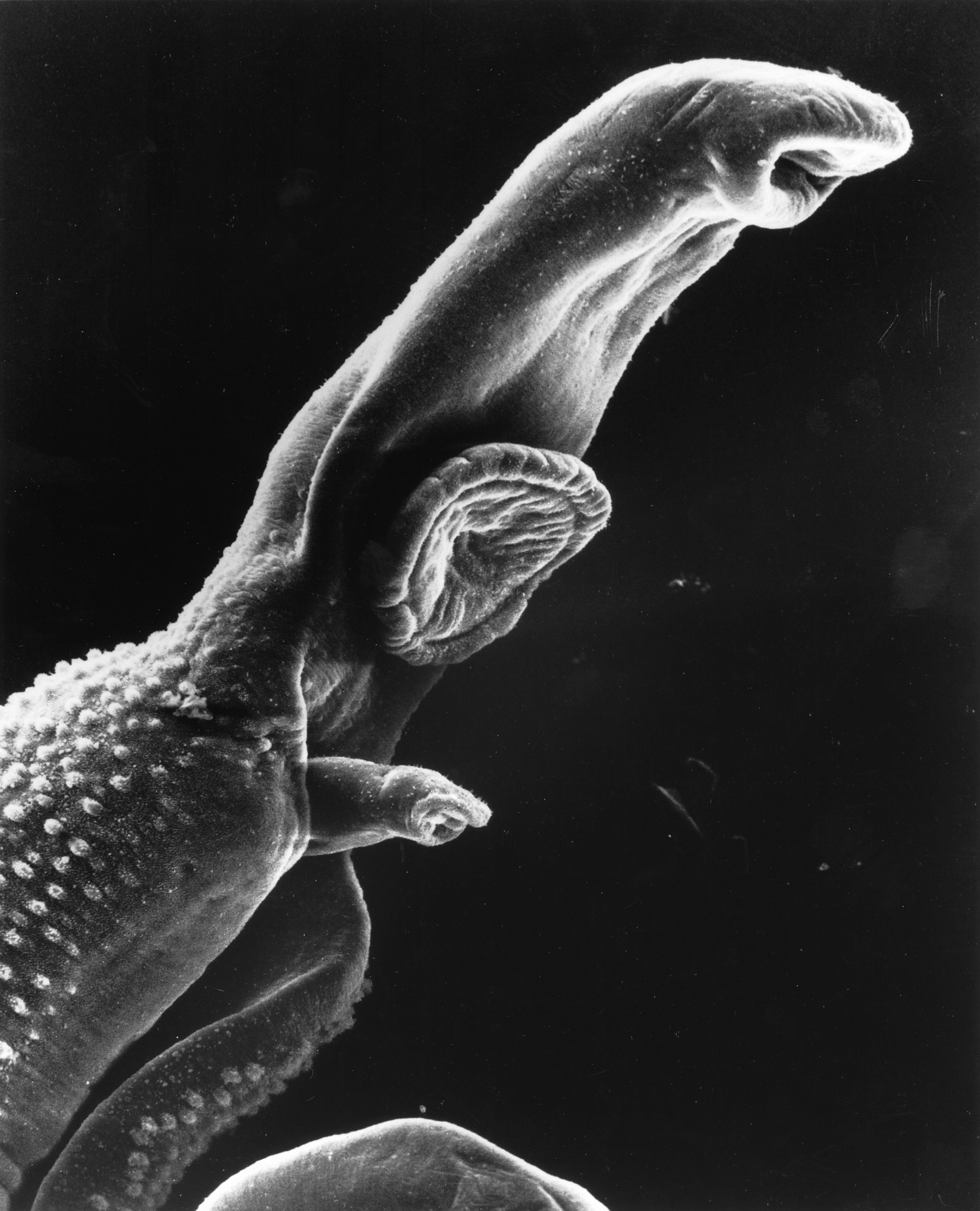
Unlike other flatworms, schistosomes are gonochoristic. The narrow female can be seen emerging from the thicker male's gynecophoral canal below his ventral sucker.

Unlike other trematodes and basically all other flatworms, the schistosomes are dioecious, i.e., the sexes are separate. The two sexes display a strong degree of sexual dimorphism, and the male is considerably larger than the female. The male surrounds the female and encloses her within his gynacophoric canal for the entire adult lives of the worms. As the male feeds on the host's blood, he passes some of it to the female. The male also passes on chemicals which complete the female's development, whereupon they will reproduce sexually. Although rare, sometimes mated schistosomes will "divorce", wherein the female will leave the male for another male. The exact reason is not understood, although it is thought that females will leave their partners to mate with more genetically distant males. Such a biological mechanism would serve to decrease inbreeding, and may be a factor behind the unusually high genetic diversity of schistosomes.

== Life Cycle ==
Freshwater snails play an important role in the life cycle and transmission of Schistosoma parasites. The parasites depend on specific snail species to develop before they can infect humans or other mammals. Changes to freshwater environments, including the construction of dams, can affect populations of snail species that serve as intermediate hosts for Schistosoma parasites. A study of Neotricula aperta, the intermediate snail host of Schistosoma mekongi, examined population growth trends following construction of the Pak-Mun dam in Thailand. When infected snails release cercariae into freshwater, people may become infected through contact with contaminated water. Understanding the relationship between the parasites, snails, and their environment is important for explaining how Schistosomiasis spreads.

Schistosoma parasites can also interact with animals other than humans. Some species infect mammals such as cattle, water buffalo, rodents, and other wild animals. These animals can serve as definitive hosts, allowing the parasites to develop into adults and reproduce. In certain species, infected animals may also contribute to the transmission of schistosomiasis by releasing parasite eggs into the environment. These interactions demonstrate how schistosoma parasites are connected to different animal hosts within an ecosystem.

== Genome ==
The genomes of Schistosoma haematobium, S. japonicum and S. mansoni have been reported.

== History ==
The eggs of these parasites were first seen by Theodor Maximilian Bilharz, a German pathologist working in Egypt in 1851 who found the eggs of Schistosoma haematobium during the course of a post mortem. He wrote two letters to his former teacher von Siebold in May and August 1851 describing his findings. Von Siebold published a paper in 1852 summarizing Bilharz's findings and naming the worms Distoma haematobium. Bilharz wrote a paper in 1856 describing the worms more fully. Their unusual morphology meant that they could not be comfortably included in Distoma. So in 1856 Meckel von Helmsback (de) created the genus Bilharzia for them. In 1858 David Friedrich Weinland proposed the name Schistosoma (Greek: "split body") because the worms were not hermaphroditic but had separate sexes. Despite Bilharzia having precedence, the genus name Schistosoma was officially adopted by the International Commission on Zoological Nomenclature. The term Bilharzia to describe infection with these parasites is still in use in medical circles.

Bilharz also described Schistosoma mansoni, but this species was redescribed by Louis Westenra Sambon in 1907 at the London School of Tropical Medicine who named it after his teacher Patrick Manson.

In 1898, all then known species were placed in a subfamily by Stiles and Hassel. This was elevated to family status by Looss in 1899. Poche in 1907 corrected a grammatical error in the family name. The life cycle of Schistosoma mansoni was determined by the Brazilian parasitologist Pirajá da Silva (1873-1961) in 1908.

In 2009, the genomes of Schistosoma mansoni and Schistosoma japonicum were decoded opening the way for new targeted treatments. In particular, the study discovered that the genome of S. mansoni contained 11,809 genes, including many that produce enzymes for breaking down proteins, enabling the parasite to bore through tissue. Also, S. mansoni does not have an enzyme to make certain fats, so it must rely on its host to produce these.
