= S. indicum =

S. indicum may refer to:

- Schistosoma indicum, a blood-fluke species
- Sesamum indicum, the sesame, a flowering plant species
- Solanum indicum (disambiguation), a synonym of a number of different subspecies and varieties of the genus Solanum

== See also ==
- Indicum (disambiguation)
