= Schistosoma hippopotami =

Scientific classification
- Domain: Eukaryota
- Kingdom: Animalia
- Phylum: Platyhelminthes
- Class: Trematoda
- Order: Diplostomida
- Family: Schistosomatidae
- Genus: Schistosoma
- Species: S. hippopotami

Binomial name
- Schistosoma hippopotami Thurston, 1961

Species of trematode

Schistosoma hippopotami is a species of digenetic trematode that belongs to the genus of blood flukes (Schistosoma) that is found in sub-Saharan Africa. It primarily infects African hippopotamuses (Hippopotamus anphibius) and has a more limited host range compared to other Schistosoma species.

Adult parasites have only been found in the heart, aorta, and multiple veins and arteries of the hippopotamuses. It has been suggested that the hippopotamus is the definitive host of S. hippopotami.

Schistosoma hippopotami was found in hippopotamuses in the Queen Elizabeth National Park in Western Uganda, along with S. edwardiense. These two species make up the S. hippopotami clade due to the fact that they are the only two Schistosoma species that infect hippopotamuses. The understanding of the existence of this clade brings the thought that this clade could be basal to all African and several Asian species of Schistosoma.

== Taxonomy ==
Schistosoma hippopotami is part of the S. hippopotami clade, along with S. edwardiense. This clade belongs to the taxonomic group of S. mansoni.

Many scientists first believed that S. hippopotami was not its own species. These researchers believed that S. hippopotami was a version of S. masoni or S. rohaini. However, further studies have helped prove that S. hippopotami was its own species

Something that was not fully understood was where the S. hippopotami clade fit on Schistosoma's phylogenic tree. It was discovered that there was a reason why this clade did not fit well with the other species. This was because of how this clade belonged at the base of most Schistosoma species. This new location implies that there could be a connection between Schistosoma and hippos. This discovery shows the importance of revisiting the standard group-based classification of schistosomes.

== Morphology ==
Schistosomes, unlike other trematodes, have separate sexes, often with significant differences between male and female worms.

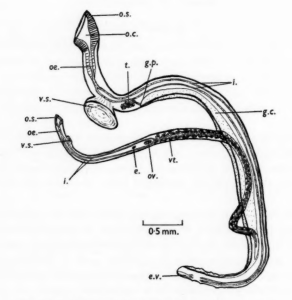
Schistosoma hippopotami pair (Thurston, 1961)

The adult worms are typically 1–2 cm long with a cylindrical body that features two suckers, one at either end, a tegument as a body covering, a blind-ending digestive tract, and male-female-specific reproductive organs. Males are significantly larger than females and typically have a ventral groove called the gynaecophoric canal. This canal holds the longer and thinner females. The process in which the adult male worm holds the adult female worm is called in copula and is when they are paired.

When first identifying S. hippopotami as a species, Thurston made some simple identifications about the female and male morphologies of S. hippopotami. The female is typically shorter than the male; she has an ovary that is shaped in an oval and situated in the anterior third of her body; the eggs have a subterminal spine; and there is typically a single egg found in the uterus. The male has an indistinct number of testes but is believed to be about four, and the intestinal caeca does not reunite to form a common caecum but instead anastomoses for very short distances posteriorly.

== Physiology ==
=== Movement ===
The muscular system of schistosomes primarily consists of non-striated muscles. This movement is made possible through coordinated activities involving the suckers, which are the key attachment organs. Schistosomes have two cup-shaped suckers, one oral and one ventral. Both suckers are characterized by having a uniform structure and often being equipped with sensory feelers called papillae.

=== Sensory ===
The nervous system consists of paired cerebral ganglia, which are located posterodorsal to the pharynx area. The cerebral ganglia are interconnected by a broad transverse commissure. The longitudinal nerve cords extend anteriorly and posteriorly. These nerve cords typically have three anterior and three posterior pairs. These nerves play a crucial role in transmitting sensory information, which includes two distinct sensory organ types. The first type features a bulb-like nerve ending that is projected from a pit. The second type comprises nonciliated curved papillae overlying a neuronal bulb in the tegument.

=== Digestion ===
The digestive system lacks a pharynx but has two ceca that combine to form a single tube connected to an esophagus. It also has a bifid intestinal ceca and a foregut with a mouth for eating and excreting. Their osmoregulatory system depends on protonephridial mechanisms with flame cells located between parenchymal cells. These cells form fine tubules that connect and create the excretory bladder, which is located in the posterior part of the body. The bladder opens by way of a terminal excretory pore.

== Life cycle ==
Schistosome life has two hosts: intermediate freshwater snails and primary mammals. The life cycle begins with parasitic eggs growing in freshwater. Larvae called miracidia hatch from the parasitic eggs and go seek out the intermediate host, the freshwater snail. For each of the different species of Schistosoma, the intermediate and primary hosts are different. For example, the intermediate host for S. edwardiense, which shares a clade and primary host with S. hippopotami, is the Biomphalaria species. However, the intermediate host of S. hippopotami is still under discussion.

Once inside the freshwater snail, the miracidia rapidly multiplies asexually and produces larvae called cercariae. These cercariae are released into the water in order to penetrate the permanent host, the mammal. Each species has a different permanent host and can have multiple options for permanent hosts. It is interesting to note that S. hippopotami has only one permanent host. This specialization makes S. hippopotami one of the few species of Schistosoma to do that.

Once inside the mammal, the parasites grow to mature, mate sexually, and produce eggs. These eggs develop with a spiral cleavage. These eggs will then be released back into the water to restart the cycle.

== Ecology ==
Schistosoma hippopotami is a parasite found in hippopotami in the Queen Elizabeth National Park in Western Uganda and in hippopotami from the Letaba River in the Kruger National Park in South Africa.

Adult S. hippopotami have only been encountered in the hippopotamus cardiovascular system. There are numerous locations within the hippopotamus vascular system where they have been encountered. Examples of these locations include the heart, the aorta, the pulmonary arteries, and the posterior vena cava.

Unlike other Schistosoma species that infect humans and cause schistosomiasis, S. hippopotami infections in humans have never been reported. The primary host for this parasite is the hippopotamus.
