= Schistosoma ovuncatum =

Scientific classification
- Kingdom: Animalia
- Phylum: Platyhelminthes
- Class: Trematoda
- Order: Diplostomida
- Family: Schistosomatidae
- Genus: Schistosoma
- Species: S. ovuncatum

Binomial name
- Schistosoma ovuncatum Attwood, Panasoponkul, Upatham, Meng & Southgate, 2002

Species of fluke

Schistosoma ovuncatum is a schistosome parasite, first described in 2002. Its recognition as a new species only occurred when zoologists were re-examining specimens originally described in 1984.

The species was described from material collected in Chiang Mai Province, northwest Thailand. The name is derived from the shape of the egg (ovum = egg + uncatus hooked). The natural final host is the rat (Rattus rattus) and the intermediate host is the pomatiopsid snail Tricula bollingi.
