= Schistosoma nasale =

Scientific classification
- Domain: Eukaryota
- Kingdom: Animalia
- Phylum: Platyhelminthes
- Class: Trematoda
- Order: Diplostomida
- Family: Schistosomatidae
- Genus: Schistosoma
- Species: S. nasale

Binomial name
- Schistosoma nasale Rao, 1933

Species of fluke

Schistosoma nasale is a species of digenetic trematode in the family Schistosomatidae. S. nasale inhabits blood vessels of the nasal mucosa and causes "snoring disease" in cattle, but remains symptomless in buffaloes though extruding its eggs in nasal discharge. The first intermediate host is a freshwater snail Indoplanorbis exustus that may be the sole natural intermediate host for Schistosoma nasale (and other two Schistosoma species) on the Indian sub-continent.

== Signs and symptoms ==
The clinical symptoms in cattle include a cauliflower-like growth or granuloma in the nasal cavity, associated with a "snoring" sound and profuse mucopurulent discharge. In the endemic areas, there are some local cattle which remain negative for S. nasale eggs, others excrete eggs but without exhibiting symptoms, while a large number exhibit symptoms with presence of the eggs in nasal discharge. A different form of nasal schistosomiasis where local cattle are negative for S. nasale but local buffaloes carry it without showing any symptoms has been shown to exist at Jabalpur, Madhya Pradesh; there, cross-bred cattle exhibit snoring disease symptoms with eggs in their nasal discharge. Anthiomaline was the drug of choice, but this leads to relapse of the symptoms after two months of the treatment. Praziquantel proved better than any other drug. Recently, Dr. M. C. Agrawal has successfully treated cases of nasal schistosomiasis by administering triclabendazole. Nevertheless, there are all chances of killing susceptible blood flukes by these less effective drugs resulting in existence of more resistant schistosome population in future generations causing more problems. Schistosoma nasale eggs are boomerang or palaquine shaped.

== History ==
Schistosoma nasale was identified in 1933 by Maharaj Anant Narayanan Rao (1875–1940) at Madras Veterinary College, Tamil Nadu, India, as a causative agent for "snoring disease" in cattle. Snails initially implicated in transmission of Schistosoma nasale as the first intermediate host included Lymnaea luteola and Lymnaea acuminata, but experimental work of Dutt and Srivastava (1962) conclusively proved Indoplanorbis exustus as the sole intermediate host of S. nasale.
