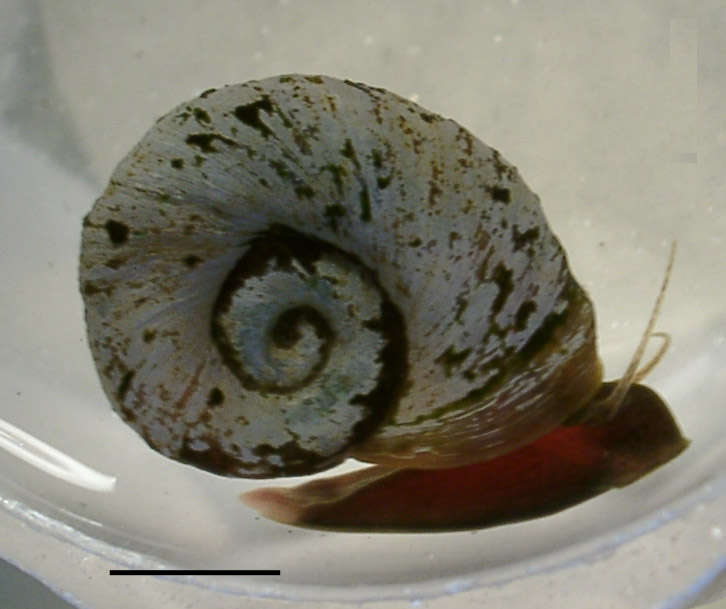

Conservation status
- Least Concern (IUCN 3.1)

Scientific classification
- Kingdom: Animalia
- Phylum: Mollusca
- Class: Gastropoda
- Superorder: Hygrophila
- Family: Bulinidae
- Genus: Indoplanorbis
- Species: I. exustus

Binomial name
- Indoplanorbis exustus (Deshayes, 1834)

Synonyms
- List: Planorbis (Helisoma) pelseneeri Dupuis, 1931; Planorbis (Indoplanorbis) exustus (Deshayes, 1833); Planorbis brunneus H. Adams & A. Adams, 1855; Planorbis circumspissus Morelet, 1863; Planorbis coromandelicus Dunker, 1850; Planorbis eburneus G. B. Sowerby II, 1877; Planorbis exustus Deshayes, 1833; Planorbis hindu Clessin, 1885; Planorbis indicus W. H. Benson, 1836; Planorbis indicus var. zonatus Clessin, 1886; Planorbis merguiensis Hanley & Theobald, 1876; Planorbis modicus H. Adams & A. Adams, 1855; Planorbis orientalis Deshayes, 1838; Planorbis zebrinus Dunker, 1856; Planorbis zonatus Clessin, 1884

= Indoplanorbis exustus =

Species of freshwater snail

Indoplanorbis exustus is a species of air-breathing freshwater snail, an aquatic pulmonate gastropod mollusk in the ram's horn snail family Bulinidae. The species is widely distributed across the tropics. It serves as an important intermediate host for several trematode parasites. The invasive nature and ecological tolerance of Indoplanorbis exustus add to its importance in veterinary and medical science.

== Taxonomy ==
Indoplanorbis exustus is the only extant species in the genus Indoplanorbis.

== Description ==
Part of the reproductive system of Indoplanorbis exustus: v.d. = vas deferens, p.s. = penis heath, sp. = sperm duct, p. = penis, e.p. = external opening.

The shell of this species, like all planorbids is sinistral in coiling, but is carried upside down and thus appears to be dextral. The shell of Indoplanorbis exustus is discoid with rapidly increasing whorls. Each whorl is higher than it is wide. The width of the shell is 5–25 mm. The height of the shell is 4.5–13 mm.

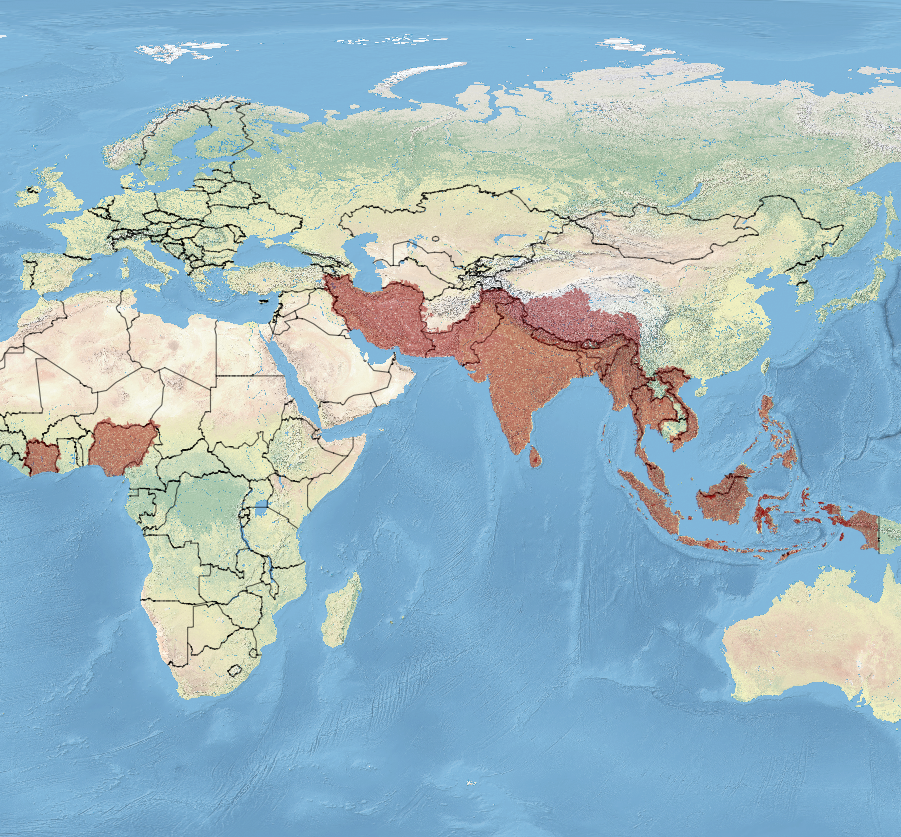
Distribution map of Indoplanorbis exustus

== Distribution ==
The freshwater snail Indoplanorbis exustus is found across Iran, Nepal, India, Sri Lanka, Southeast Asia (for example Thailand), central Asia (Afghanistan), Arabia and Africa.

The type locality of Indoplanorbis exustus is marshes on the coast of Malabar in south-western India.

Indoplanorbis exustus is a common snail across Southeast Asia and the Indian sub-continent. The snail is also found in the Middle East (Oman and Socotra) and Nigeria and the Ivory Coast; these findings were attributed by Brandt (1974) to recent introductions by human activities (Brandt's view has been frequently cited in the literature on Indoplanorbis). In contrast to Asia, the well documented appearance of the snail in Africa (e.g., Nigeria and Ivory Coast) and more recently (2002) in the Lesser Antilles, is almost certainly the result of introductions through human activities over the last 50–100 years.

This species is already established in the US, and is considered to represent a potentially serious threat as a pest, an invasive species which could negatively affect agriculture, natural ecosystems, human health or commerce. Therefore, it has been suggested that this species be given top national quarantine significance in the US.

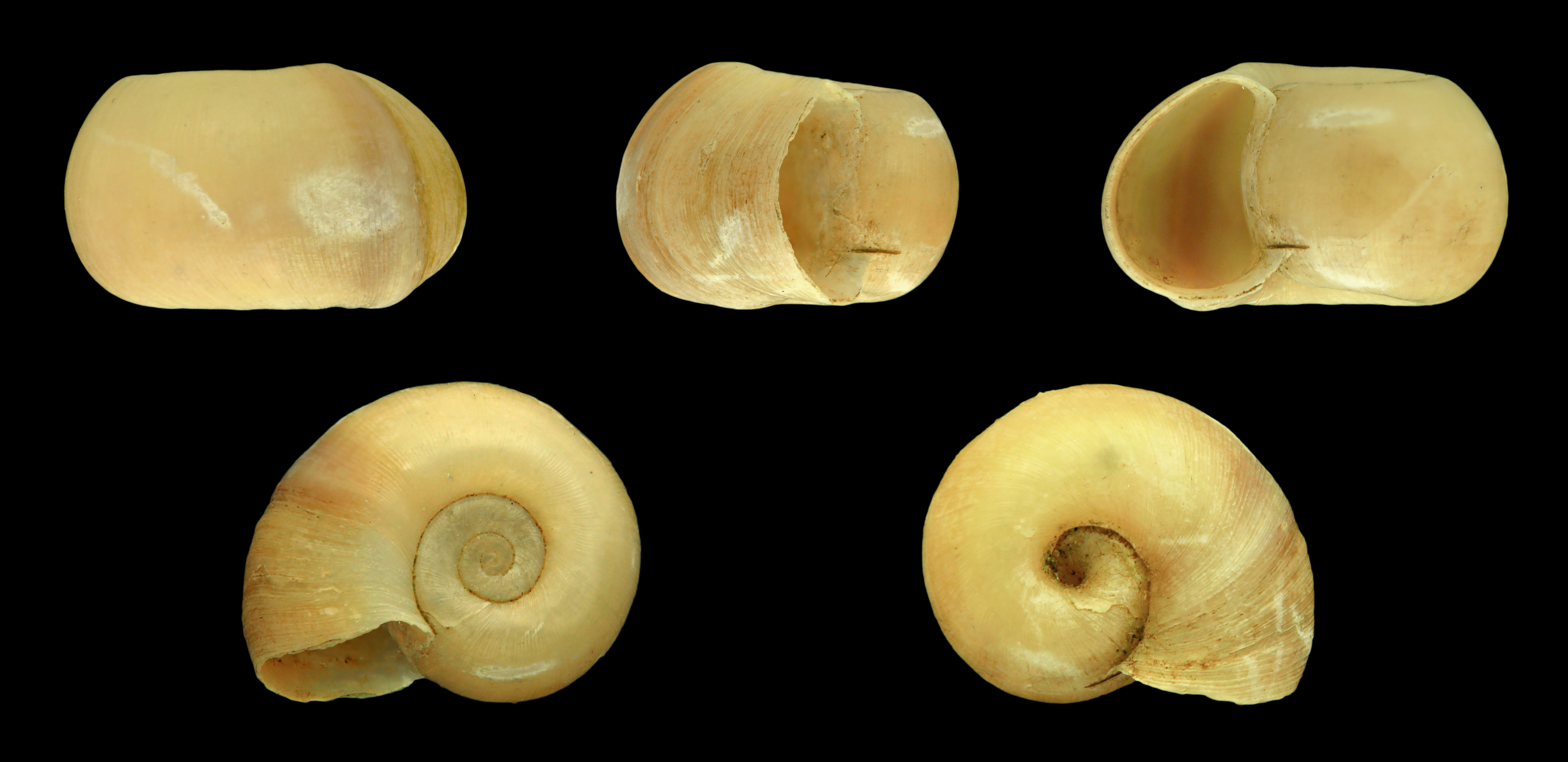
Five views of a shell.

Planorbella duryi and Biomphalaria pfeifferi have similar shells.

Because of its wide distribution, various aspects of Indoplanorbis exustus have been studied, such as its calcium regulation and its hemocytes.

== Ecology ==
In captivity Indoplanorbis exustus can be reared on lettuce and spinach. Its diet is sometimes supplemented with sheep's liver and it can be given rat food to prepare for breeding.

=== Habitat ===
The snail is found in small ponds, pools, and less commonly in rice paddy fields. The snail may also occur in semi-permanent pools formed in flooded areas of fields, where it can survive the dry season buried in mud. The desiccation tolerance of adult snails is high, while the resistance of juvenile snails is very low. Consequently, dispersal may occur in clumps of mud adhered to the bodies of cattle or across water in vegetation mats. It is possible it could be transported by birds.

=== Life cycle ===
Indoplanorbis exustus is a hermaphroditic invasive snail species with high fecundity. Within one year of introduction the snail is able to colonize habitats with well established populations of other pulmonate and prosobranch snails. The snail requires a water temperature in excess of 15 °C for maturation. At the optimum temperature of 30 °C each snail can lay up to 800 eggs. There is from 2 to 43 eggs in one cluster with an average 20 eggs in one cluster. The capacity for self-fertilization and high fecundity probably underlies the invasive potential of the species. The average life span of Indoplanorbis exustus is 4 months and during this time it lays about 60 egg clusters.

=== Predators ===
Eggs of Indoplanorbis exustus were experimentally predated and destroyed by Pomacea bridgesii. Raut & Aditya (2002) hypothetized that Pomacea bridgesii could be a potential biocontrol agent for Indoplanorbis exustus.

=== Parasites ===
Indoplanorbis exustus is best known as the intermediate host responsible for the transmission of Schistosoma nasale and S. spindale, as well as other trematodes such as Echinostoma spp. and some spirorchids. These species infect cattle and cause reduced livestock productivity. The snail is also of medical importance as a source of cercarial dermatitis among rural workers, particularly in India.A third species of Schistosoma, S. indicum (Montgomery, 1906), is also transmitted by I. exustus. I. exustus is the most important host for S. nasale and S. spindale, as well as for S. indicum in certain regions. I. exustus may be the sole natural intermediate host for these three Schistosoma species on the Indian sub-continent.

Indoplanorbis exustus is also an intermediate host for:

- Artyfechinostomum malayanum – as the first intermediate host
- Hypoderaeum conoideum – as the first intermediate host
- Fasciola gigantica
- Paramphistomum mehrai
- Paramphistomum explanatum
- Gastrodiscus secundus
- Petagifer srivastavi
- Plasmiorchis orientalis
- Pseudodiscus collinsi
- Gastrothylax crumenifer
- Enterohaemotrema paleorticum
- Cotylophoron cotylophorum
- Cotylophoron indica
- Cotylophoron bhaleraoi
- Cotylophoron mathurapurensis

Indoplanorbis exustus has been implicated in outbreaks of cercarial dermatitis in human populations in India, Laos, Malaysia and Thailand. Cercarial dermatitis results from the cutaneous allergic reaction in people exposed to larval schistosomes (cercariae) shed by infected snails into freshwater bodies such as lakes, ponds, and paddy fields. The cercariae cause pruritus (itching) and papular eruptions, with often severe secondary infections, as they attempt to infect a non-permissive definitive host and die in the skin.

=== Toxicology ===
Aqueous extract of a common medicinal plant of India Euphorbia tithymaloides (Euphorbiaceae) has molluscicidal activity against Indoplanorbis exustus.

Ethanol extract of Solanum xanthocarpum has molluscicidal activity against Indoplanorbis exustus LC_{50} = 198.00 mg/L and LC_{90} = 236.80 mg/L.

The latex of Euphorbia milii has molluscicidal activity against Indoplanorbis exustus that depends on its hybrid of the plant.

The molluscicidal activity of latex of Cascabela thevetia, Alstonia scholaris and Euphorbia pulcherrima against Indoplanorbis exustus was examined by Singh & Sunil (2005).

== Human use ==
It is a part of ornamental pet trade for freshwater aquaria.
