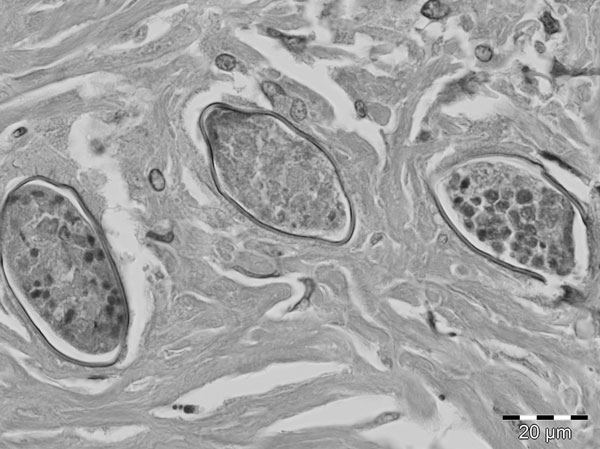

Scientific classification
- Kingdom: Animalia
- Phylum: Platyhelminthes
- Class: Trematoda
- Order: Diplostomida
- Family: Schistosomatidae
- Genus: Schistosoma
- Species: S. malayensis

Binomial name
- Schistosoma malayensis Greer, Ow-Yang & Yong, 1988

= Schistosoma malayensis =

Species of fluke

Schistosoma malayensis is a schistosome parasite. It was first described in 1988 in Peninsular Malaysia and appears to be a zoonotic infection. The species is named after the country of Malaysia. The natural vertebrate host is van Müller's rat (Rattus muelleri). The intermediate hosts are aquatic snails, Robertsiella kaporenisis. Aside from Robertsiella kaporenisis, two other Robertsiella species are reported intermediate hosts.

Among humans exposed to this parasite the lifetime incidence appears to be 5–10%. The symptoms are unclear, never having been reported. The disease has been little studied and it is currently considered to be a relatively minor public health problem.

== Taxonomy ==
Schistosoma malayensis is a member of the japonicum species complex along with Schistosoma japonicum and Schistosoma mekongi. While the three species are grouped together because of their similarity, Schistosoma malayensis is more closely related to Schistosoma mekongi.

== Morphology ==
Size is the only morphological difference compared to its natural host possibly due to host-induced variation. The adult S. malayensis is typically smaller than S. mekongi and S. japonicum.

S. malayensis eggs have been found in liver granulomas, embedded within dense, fibrous tissue. The eggs of S. malayensis have a thin-walled, yellowish shell. The eggs contain miracidia and are approximately 50 μm long × 28 μm wide. The ova is not operculated and has no bipolar plugs and the thin covering was not striated.

== Epidemiology ==
Serologic surveys for schistosomiasis due to S. malayensis indicate of 3.9% prevalence in rural populations. It was unsuccessful at adapting to human host. Infected rodents are often found near snail habitats. Infections in humans are unlikely and are considered rare. Humans are most likely to become infected while fishing or canoeing on small streams.

== Intermediate host ==
Freshwater snails (Robertsiella sp.) act as an intermediate host for S. malayensis, that can infect humans and other mammals when cercaria are released from the snail and eventually get in contact with the definitive host. Robertsiella species are Caenogastropoda snails of the family Pomatiopsidae. This species is known to be located in limestone areas in the foothills of the mountain chains of Kedah and Perak States in West Malaysia.

== Definitive host ==
The final or definitive mammalian hosts include Rattus muelleri and R. tiomanicus. R. muelleri has been found in lowland secondary, and disturbed primary forests in wet conditions in Western Malaysia. R. muelleri is often found near river banks due to the species prioritization of crustaceans and mollusks over other food sources, such as insects. The predation of mollusks by R. muelleri allows S. malayensis a route into its definitive host. It is possible infected rodents defecate in bodies of water they hunt for prey in, maintaining a constant contamination with S. malayensis eggs and continuing the life cycle.
