= Schistosoma indicum =

Scientific classification
- Domain: Eukaryota
- Kingdom: Animalia
- Phylum: Platyhelminthes
- Class: Trematoda
- Order: Diplostomida
- Family: Schistosomatidae
- Genus: Schistosoma
- Species: S. indicum

Binomial name
- Schistosoma indicum Montgomery, 1906

Species of fluke

Schistosoma indicum is a species of digenetic trematode in the family Schistosomatidae. The parasite is widespread in domestic animals in India and other Asian countries.

Schistosoma indicum was discovered by the British scientist R. E. Montgomery, in 1906, from a horse from Mukteswar, Uttar Pradesh, India. This blood-fluke causes hepato-intestinal schistosomiasis in many domestic animals (sheep, goat, water buffalo, cattle, camel, horse, donkey, dog, but not pigs). It was responsible for an outbreak of pulmonary schistosomiasis, in 1981, in sheep in Rajasthan, leading to considerable mortality. S.indicum caused considerable mortality in the sheep flocks in Andhra Pradesh and Karnataka but it was misdiagnosed as Rinder Pest, highlighting the problem of proper diagnosis of the infection in domestic animals. S.indicum has been detected from almost all the states of India and is more widespread than Schistosoma spindale.

== Intermediate hosts ==
The parasite's most important intermediate host is a freshwater snail Indoplanorbis exustus that is the sole natural intermediate host for S. indicum (and other two Schistosoma species) on the Indian sub-continent. Earlier another snail (Lymnaea luteola) was also implicated in transmission of S. indicum, but subsequent research refuted that possibility.

== Gimvi village dispute ==
A variant of S. indicum, rather than Schistosoma haematobium, was suggested to be responsible for human schistosomiasis in Gimvi village, Ratnagiri district, India, but was later disputed by other scientists. The main reasons were the use of a different intermediate host (Ferrissia tenuis) and final host (humans) with difference in location (urinary system) which is not possible for any variant. Terminal-spined S. indicum-like eggs have been detected in human stools. Dr. M. C. Agrawal demonstrated cross-immunity against Schistosoma incognitum by immunising the host against S. indicum.
