= Solanum indicum =

Solanum indicum can refer to:

- Solanum indicum L., a synonym of Solanum lasiocarpum Dunal
- Solanum indicum Roxb., a synonym of Solanum melongena L., eggplant
- A number of varieties and subspecies now assigned to Solanum anguivi Lam.
