= Tricula bollingi =

Scientific classification
- Domain: Eukaryota
- Kingdom: Animalia
- Phylum: Mollusca
- Class: Gastropoda
- Subclass: Caenogastropoda
- Order: Littorinimorpha
- Family: Pomatiopsidae
- Genus: Tricula
- Species: T. bollingi

Binomial name
- Tricula bollingi G. M. Davis, 1968

Species of gastropod

Tricula bollingi is a species of freshwater snail with a gill and an operculum, an aquatic gastropod mollusk in the family Pomatiopsidae. This species is common in Thailand.

== Parasites ==
Tricula bollingi is an intermediate host for Schistosoma ovuncatum.
