= Pirajá da Silva =

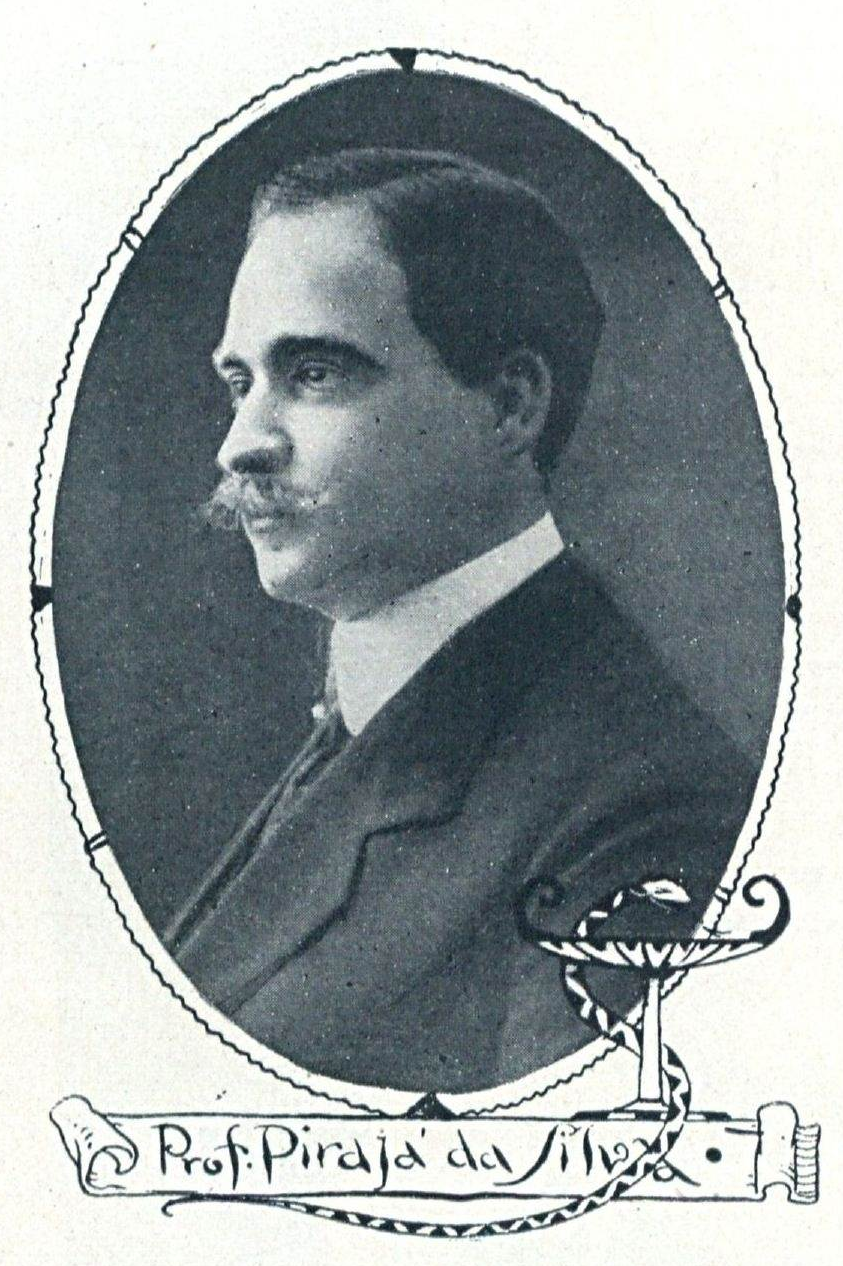
- Born: 28 January 1873; Camamu, Bahia, Brazil
- Died: 1 March 1961 (aged 88); Salvador, Bahia, Brazil
- Known for: Schistosomiasis disease

Manuel Augusto Pirajá da Silva (28 January 1873 – 1 March 1961) was a Brazilian parasitologist, medical researcher, and physician.

== Biography ==
He graduated from the Faculty of Medicine of Bahia (now part of the Federal University of Bahia) in 1896, and in 1908 was responsible for the identification and complete description of the pathogenic agent and the pathophysiological cycle of schistosomiasis disease.

== Legacy ==
A species of venomous snake, Bothrops pirajai, is named in his honor.
