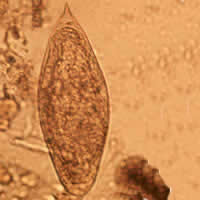
- Egg of Schistosoma intercalatum

Scientific classification
- Domain: Eukaryota
- Kingdom: Animalia
- Phylum: Platyhelminthes
- Class: Trematoda
- Order: Diplostomida
- Family: Schistosomatidae
- Genus: Schistosoma
- Species: S. intercalatum

Binomial name
- Schistosoma intercalatum Fisher, 1934

= Schistosoma intercalatum =

Species of fluke

Schistosoma intercalatum is a parasitic worm found in parts of western and central Africa. There are two strains: the Lower Guinea strain and the Zaire strain. S. intercalatum is one of the major agents of the rectal form of schistosomiasis, also called bilharzia. It is a trematode, and being part of the genus Schistosoma, it is commonly referred to as a blood-fluke since the adult resides in blood vessels.

Humans are the definitive host and two species of freshwater snail make up the intermediate host, Bulinus forskalii for the Lower Guinea strain and Bulinus africanus for the Zaire strain.

== Morphology ==
The clinically defining characteristic of most schistosome species are their eggs' size and shape. The eggs of Schistosoma intercalatum have a terminal spine and tend to be moderately larger than those of S. haematobium (approximately 130 × 75 μm). The origin of the name 'intercalatum' is from the observation that their eggs are of an intermediate range between the smaller S. haematobium and larger S. bovis. These eggs are unique because they will stain red when exposed to the Ziehl–Neelsen technique, aiding in identification. When viewed using scanning electron microscopy, it can be observed that the S. intercalatum's surface has a much lower amount of integumental elevations, or bosses, than S. mansoni. This feature is consistent with the tegument appearance of other terminally spined schistosomes.

== Life cycle ==
Schistosoma intercalatum's life cycle is very similar to that of S. haematobium, except for some key differences. To start the life cycle, the human host releases eggs with its feces. In water, the eggs hatch to become miracidia, which penetrate the freshwater snail intermediate host. S. intercalatum has two major strains, each with its own preferred bulinid host. The Zaire strain will use Bulinus africanus, while the Lower Guinea strain will use the extremely common B. forskalii as its intermediate host. The miracidia penetrate the snail tissue, and inside they become sporocysts and multiply. The sporocysts then mature into cercariae inside the snail host and are ready to leave. The cercariae are free-swimming in the surrounding water until they find their definitive host: a human. If there is a small temperature change, the cercariae of S. intercalatum will form concentrated aggregates near the surface of the water. This mechanism for body heat detection of a potential host restricts the formation of viable cercariae to small streams and slow moving bodies of water because of their high sensitivity.

The cercariae penetrate through the human's skin and lose their tail, becoming schistosomulae. The schistosomulae then migrate to the hepatic portal system of the liver to mature into adults. As adults, they make their way to the inferior mesenteric vein and mate, producing thousands of eggs. These eggs migrate down to the mesenteric venules of the colon and form polyps as the eggs attempt to cross into the lumen. S. intercalatum's eggs are specific to the colon, making them unique among the infectious African schistosomes.

== Epidemiology ==
S. intercalatum is at risk of endangerment in large part due to the introduction of invasive species into its native habitat. Since 1973, both S. mansoni and S. haematobium have been found in places that have been traditionally inhabited by S. intercalatum. This is thought to be because of the increase in transportation accessibility and the increase in forestry jobs in these habitats. Male S. mansoni and S. haematobium will both take priority over S. intercalatum when it comes to mate selection, leading to a smaller proportion of female S. intercalatum available for mating. While crosses with S. mansoni give no viable offspring, the pairing with a male S. haematobium will result in a hybrid organism. Most hybrids will have a diluted genome that is more closely related to S. haematobium, helping to bring about a decline in S. intercalatum populations. The other obstacle restricting the parasite's population growth is its selective distribution. The cercariae are very particular over where they develop, needing small, forested areas with streams to infect their human host. There are only a few of these regions in Africa, and they decrease in size every day due to deforestation.

=== Prevalence ===
In 2009, there were an estimated 200 million human infections of schistosomiasis. In 1999, the noted number of S. intercalatum infections was 1.73 million.

=== Distribution ===
There are two major strains of S. intercalatum, both living in forested areas of Africa. One strain lives in the Congo area, particularly Zaire, and the other strain lives in the Lower Guinea area, mainly in Cameroon. Cameroon is a place of scientific interest because three species of human schistosomes live there. Most relevant research conducted on S. intercalatum was performed in, or around, the Loum area in Cameroon.

== Pathology ==
=== Symptoms ===
Symptoms of all forms of schistosomiasis are caused by the immune system's reaction to the eggs, rather than the adult worms themselves. A few hours to days after cercariae invade the skin, some people experience pruritus and raised papules at the site of penetration. This is called cercarial dermatitis, also known as swimmer's itch. It can last up to a few weeks, although, this stage is usually asymptomatic in local populations. S. intercalatum is associated with lower morbidity than the other schistosomes that infect humans. In a study done on schoolchildren in the Republic of São Tomé and Príncipe in western Africa—where S. intercalatum and S. haematobium are endemic—the only schistosome present in the sample was S. intercalatum, an overall prevalence of 10.9 percent in stool specimens.

Unlike the more pathogenic species, infection with S. intercalatum is usually only associated with bloody stool, and sometimes splenomegaly. Blood in the stool is caused by "inflammation, hypertrophy, and ulceration of the mucosa" of the intestine. These signs can be difficult to interpret because affected populations are often infected with multiple intestinal parasites. Clinical presentation of an established S. intercalatum infection can be different in the local population and non-immune tourists. The majority of infections of foreign travelers are asymptomatic and go unnoticed. Chronic schistosomiasis results in granulomata forming around eggs in the mesenteric vessels.

=== Diagnosis ===
Diagnosis is usually made using clinical and epidemiological information. Infection with S. intercalatum can be distinguished from that of S. mansoni or S. haematobium based on where eggs manifest outside the body and the morphology of the eggs. In Africa, the only species of schistosome are S. intercalatum, S. mansoni, and S. haematobium. S. haematobium causes urinary schistosomiasis, so eggs will be shed in the urine; S. mansoni and S. intercalatum reside in the mesenteric venous plexus, so eggs will be shed in the feces. Looking at the stool specimen under a microscope, the species can be distinguished; S. intercalatum eggs have a terminal spine (as seen in the figure above) and S. mansoni eggs have a lateral spine.

Serologic testing looks for the presence of antibodies against the adult schistosome in the blood. This can only take place 6 to 8 weeks after initial infection in order for the parasite to reach the adult stage and the immune system to produce antibodies against it. However, serologic testing is not useful for patients with previous infections.

=== Treatment ===
Praziquantel is an effective treatment against all species of Schistosoma that infect humans. Administering treatment at the correct time is important since the drug only works against the adult worm and there must be a strong antibody response from the immune system. Thus, it should be administered 6 to 8 weeks after suspected infection (contact with infested freshwater). There has been limited evidence on possible drug resistance among the schistosomes due to reports of low cure rates. Oxaminiquine is another treatment for schistosomiasis, but it is not widely available, nor is it routinely used.
