= Robertsiella =

Scientific classification
- Kingdom: Animalia
- Phylum: Mollusca
- Class: Gastropoda
- Subclass: Caenogastropoda
- Order: Littorinimorpha
- Family: Pomatiopsidae
- Genus: Robertsiella; Davis & Greer, 1980

Diversity
- 3 species

Genus of gastropods

Robertsiella is a genus of freshwater snails which have a gill and an operculum, gastropod mollusks or micromollusks in the family Pomatiopsidae.

== Distribution ==
The distribution of Robertsiella includes Malaysia.

== Species ==
Species within the genus Robertsiella include:

- Robertsiella gismanni Davis & Greer, 1980
- Robertsiella kaporensis Davis & Greer, 1980
- Robertsiella silvicola Attwood, Lokman & Ong, 2005
