= Schistosomiasis =

Human disease caused by parasitic worms called schistosomes

- Other names: Bilharzia, snail fever, Katayama fever
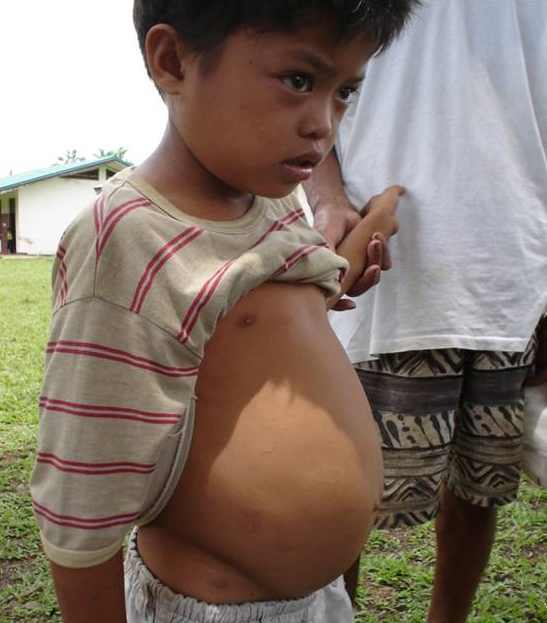
- 11-year-old boy with abdominal fluid and portal hypertension due to schistosomiasis (Agusan del Sur, Philippines)
- Pronunciation: /ˌʃɪstəsəˈmaɪəsɪs, -toʊ-, -soʊ-/
- Specialty: Infectious disease
- Symptoms: Abdominal pain, diarrhea, bloody stool, blood in the urine
- Complications: Liver damage, cirrhosis, kidney failure, infertility (both male and female), bladder calcification, urethral obstruction, nephrotic syndrome, bladder cancer
- Causes: Schistosomes from freshwater snails
- Diagnostic method: Finding eggs of the parasite in urine or stool, antibodies in blood
- Prevention: Access to clean water
- Medication: Praziquantel
- Frequency: 252 million (2015)
- Deaths: 4,400–200,000

Schistosomiasis, also known as snail fever, bilharzia, and Katayama fever is a tropical disease, specifically a helminthiasis caused by the parasitic flatworm of the genus Schistosoma. Schistosomiasis affects humans as well as other animals. It affects the urinary tract or the intestines. Symptoms include abdominal pain, diarrhea, bloody stool, or blood in the urine. Those who have had a schistosomiasis infection for a long time may experience liver damage, kidney failure, infertility, or bladder cancer. In children, schistosomiasis may cause failure to thrive, poor growth, and learning difficulties. Schistosomiasis is classified as a helminth infection.

Schistosomiasis is spread by contact with fresh water contaminated with parasites released from infected freshwater snails. Medical diagnosis is made by finding the parasite's eggs in a person's urine or stool. Diagnosis can also be confirmed by finding antibodies against the disease in the blood.

Methods of preventing the disease include improving access to clean water and reducing the number of snails. In areas where the disease is common, the medication praziquantel may be given once a year to the entire at-risk group. This is done to decrease the number of people infected, and consequently, the spread of the disease. Praziquantel is also the treatment recommended by the World Health Organization (WHO) for those who are known to be infected.

The disease is especially common among children in developing countries, as children there are more likely to play in contaminated water. Schistosomiasis is also common among women, as they generally have greater exposure through daily chores that involve water, such as washing clothes and fetching water. Other high-risk groups include farmers, fishermen, and people using unclean water during daily living.

In 2019, schistosomiasis impacted approximately 236.6 million individuals across the globe. Each year, it is estimated that between 4,400 and 200,000 individuals succumb to it. The illness predominantly occurs in regions of Africa, Asia, and South America, where approximately 700 million individuals in over 70 nations reside in regions where the disease is prevalent. In tropical regions, schistosomiasis ranks as the second most economically significant parasitic disease, second only to malaria. Schistosomiasis is classified as a neglected tropical disease.

== Signs and symptoms ==
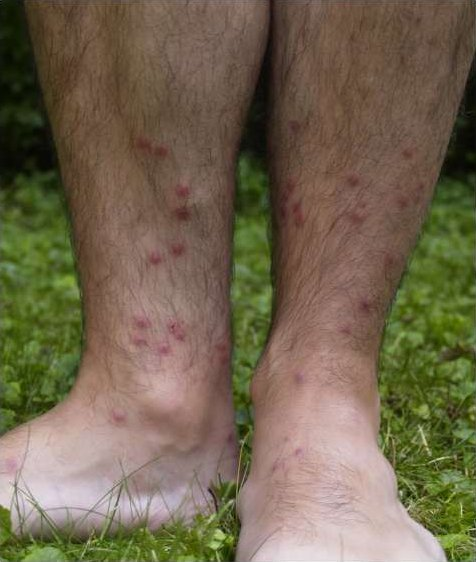
Cercarial dermatitis can present as an itchy, red, maculopapular rash (flat and raised lesions) at the sites of cercarial penetration.

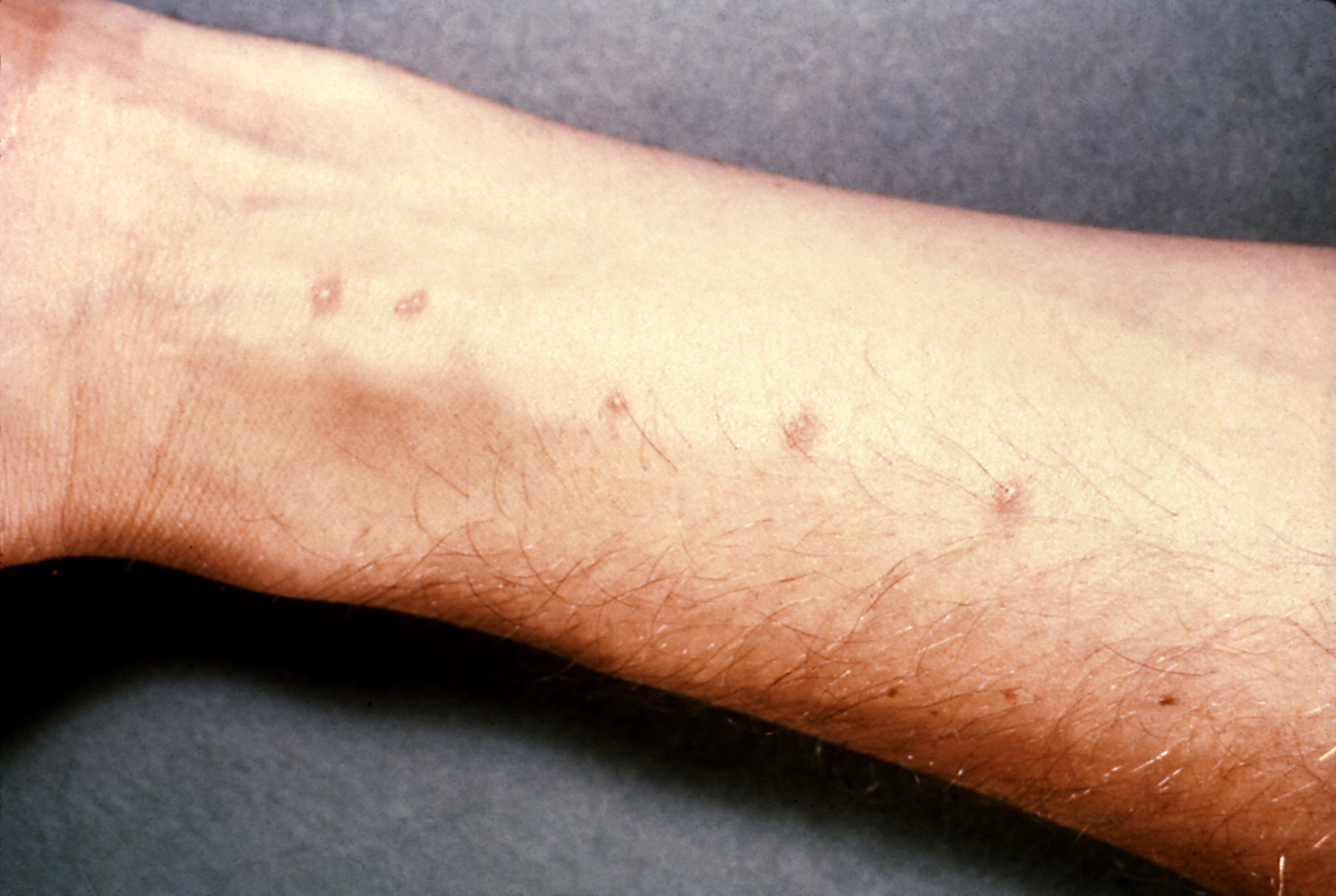
Skin blisters on the forearm, created by the entrance of Schistosoma parasites

Many individuals do not experience symptoms. If symptoms do appear, they usually have an incubation period of about 4–6 weeks. The first symptom of the disease may be a general feeling of illness. Within 12 hours of infection, an individual may develop cercarial dermatitis due to irritation at the point of entrance, commonly referred to as "swimmer's itch". The rash that may develop can mimic scabies and other rashes.

The manifestation of a schistosomal infection varies over time as cercariae, (the larval form of the parasite) and later the adult worms and their eggs, migrate through the body. If eggs migrate to the brain or spinal cord, seizures, paralysis, or spinal cord inflammation are possible.

=== Acute infection ===
Manifestation of acute infection from schistosomiasis includes cercarial dermatitis (hours to days) and acute systemic schistosomiasis (2–8 weeks) which can include symptoms of fever, myalgia, a cough, bloody diarrhea, chills, or lymph node enlargement. Some patients may also experience dyspnea and hypoxia associated with the development of pulmonary infiltrates.

=== Cercarial dermatitis ===
The first potential reaction is an itchy, maculopapular rash that, within the first 12 hours to days of penetration, results from cercariae penetrating the skin. The first time a non-sensitized person is exposed, the rashes are usually mild with an associated prickling sensation that quickly disappears on its own since this is a type of hypersensitivity reaction. In sensitized people who have previously been infected, the rash can develop into itchy, red, raised lesions (papules) with some turning into fluid-filled lesions (vesicles). Previous infections with cercariae causes a faster developing and worse presentation of dermatitis due to the stronger immune response. The round bumps are usually one to three centimeters across.

Because people living in affected areas have often been repeatedly exposed, acute reactions are more common in tourists and migrants. The rash can occur between the first few hours and a week after exposure, and they normally resolve on their own in around 7–10 days. For human schistosomiasis, a similar type of dermatitis called "swimmer's itch" can also be caused by cercariae from animal trematodes that often infect birds. Cercarial dermatitis is not contagious and can not be transmitted from person-to-person.

Symptoms may include:

- Flat, red rash
- Small red, raised pimples
- Small red blisters
- Prickling or tingling sensation, burning, itching of the skin

Scratching the rash can lead to secondary bacterial infection of the skin, thus it is important to refrain from scratching. Common treatments for itching include corticosteroid cream, anti-itch lotion, application of cool compresses to rash, bathing in Epsom salts or baking soda, and in severe cases, prescription strength cream and lotions. Oral antihistamines can also help relieve the itching.

=== Acute schistosomiasis (Katayama fever) ===
Acute schistosomiasis (Katayama fever) may occur weeks or months (around 2–8 weeks) after the initial infection as a systemic reaction against migrating schistosomulae as they pass through the bloodstream, through the lungs, and to the liver; and also against the antigens of eggs. Similarly to swimmer's itch, Katayama fever is more commonly seen in people with their first infection such as migrants and tourists, and it is associated with heavy infection. However, it is also seen in native residents of China infected with S. japonicum. S. japonicum can cause acute schistosomiasis in a chronically infected population, and can lead to a more severe form of acute schistosomiasis.

Symptoms may include:

- Dry cough with changes on chest X-ray
- Fever
- Fatigue
- Muscle aches
- Headache
- Malaise
- Abdominal pain
- Diarrhea
- Enlargement of the liver (hepatomegaly), the spleen (splenomegaly), or both (hepatosplenomegaly)
- Hives

Acute schistosomiasis self-resolves within 2–8 weeks in most cases, but a small proportion of people have persistent weight loss, diarrhea, diffuse abdominal pain, and rash.

Neurological complications may include:

- Spinal cord inflammation (transverse myelitis) may occur if worms or eggs travel to the spinal cord during this acute phase of infection.
- Headaches
- Disturbances of sensorium
- Hemiplegia
- Tetraplegia
- Visual impairment
- Ataxia/ speech impairment
- Motor paralysis

Cardiac complications may include:

- Myocarditis
- Pericarditis
- Asymptomatic myocardial ischemia

Treatment may include:

- Corticosteroid such as prednisone is used to alleviate the hypersensitivity reaction and reduce inflammation.
- Praziquantel can be administered to kill adult schistosomes and prevent chronic infection in addition to corticosteroid therapy. It is ineffective for recent infections as it only targets adult worms rather than premature schistosomulae. Therefore, a repeat praziquantel treatment several weeks after initial infection may be warranted. It is recommended to treat with praziquantel 4–6 weeks after initial exposure since it targets adult worms. For acute schistosomiasis (AS), praziquantel is ineffective on schistosomulae after 7 days and does not prevent the chronic phase of the disease. Too early treatment can worsen symptoms of AS. In some cases, this worsening of symptoms can be life-threatening by causing encephalitis related to vasculitis, myocarditis, or pulmonary events.
- Oxamniquine (50 mg/kg once) can be administered in the early phase of schistosomiasis. It is more effective against schistsomulae than praziquantel, but only with S. mansoni. This prevents the chronic S. mansoni infection and egg-laying stages.
- Artemether is an artemisin derivative efficient against schistosomulae aged 7–21 days, but only reduces S. mansoni infection by 50% in exposed children.

=== Chronic infection ===
In long-established schistosomiasis, adult worms lay eggs that can cause inflammatory reactions. The eggs secrete proteolytic enzymes that help them migrate to the bladder and intestines to be shed. The enzymes also cause an eosinophilic inflammatory reaction when eggs get trapped in tissues or embolize to the liver, spleen, lungs, or brain. The long-term manifestations are dependent on the species of schistosome, as the adult worms of different species migrate to different areas. Many infections are mildly symptomatic, with anemia and malnutrition being common in endemic areas.

==== Intestinal schistosomiasis ====
The worms of S. mansoni and S. japonicum migrate to the gastrointestinal tract and liver veins. Eggs in the gut wall can lead to pain, bloody stool, and diarrhea (especially in children). Severe disease can lead to narrowing of the colon or rectum.

In intestinal schistosomiasis, eggs become lodged in the intestinal wall during their migration from the mesenteric venules to the intestinal lumen, and the trapped eggs cause an immune system reaction called a granulomatous reaction. They mostly affect the large bowel and rectum, and involvement of the small bowel is rare. This immune response can lead to colonic obstruction and blood loss. The infected individual may have what appears to be a potbelly. There is a strong correlation between the morbidity of intestinal schistosomiasis and the intensity of infection. In light infections, symptoms may be mild and can go unrecognized. The most common species to cause intestinal schistosomiasis are S. mansoni and S. japonicum, however, S. mekongi and S. intercalatum can also cause this disease.

Symptoms may include:

- Abdominal pain and discomfort
- Loss of appetite
- Mucous diarrhea with or without gross blood
- Blood in feces that is not visibly present (fecal occult blood)
- Abdominal distention

Complications may include:

- Intestinal polyps
- Intestinal ulcers
- Iron-deficient anemia
- Fistula
- Bowel strictures (narrowing of colon or rectum)
- Protein-losing enteropathy
- Partial or complete bowel obstruction
- Appendicitis (rare)

Approximately 10–50% of people living in endemic regions of S. mansoni and S. japonicum develop intestinal schistosomiasis. S. mansoni infection epidemiologically overlaps with high HIV prevalence in Sub-Saharan Africa, where gastrointestinal schistosomiasis has been linked to increased HIV transmission.

==== Hepatosplenic schistosomiasis ====
Eggs also migrate to the liver, leading to fibrosis in 4 to 8% of people with chronic infection, mainly those with long-term heavy infection.

Eggs can become lodged in the liver, leading to portal hypertension, splenomegaly, the buildup of fluid in the abdomen, and potentially life-threatening dilations or swollen areas in the esophagus or gastrointestinal tract that can tear and bleed profusely (esophageal varices). This condition can be separated into two phases: inflammatory hepatic schistosomiasis (early inflammatory reaction) and chronic hepatic schistosomiasis. Most common species to cause this condition are S. mansoni, S. japonicum, and S. mekongi.

Inflammatory hepatic schistosomiasis occurs mainly in children and adolescents due to early immune reaction to eggs trapped within the periportal and presinusoidal spaces of the liver creating numerous granulomas. Liver function is unaffected, and the severity of liver and spleen enlargement is correlated to the intensity of the infection. It is characterized by an enlarged left lobe of the liver with a sharp edge and an enlarged spleen with nodules. The liver and spleen enlargement is usually mild, but in severe cases, they can enlarge to the level of the belly button and even into the pelvis.

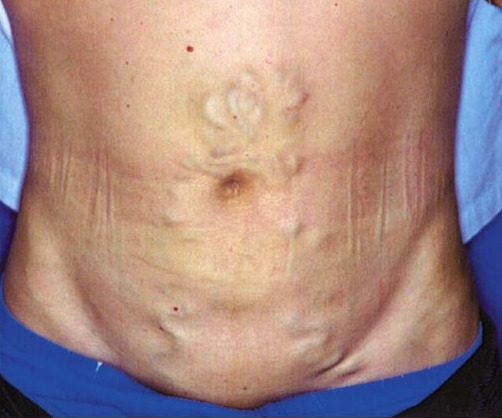
Caput medusae can occur as a result of portal hypertension caused by periportal fibrosis

Chronic (fibrotic) hepatic schistosomiasis is a late-stage liver disease that occurs mainly in young and middle-aged adults who have been chronically infected with a heavy infection and whose immune regulation of fibrosis is not functioning properly. It affects only a small proportion of infected people. It does not affect liver function or architecture, unlike cirrhosis. The pathogenesis of this disease is caused by deposition of collagen and extracellular matrix proteins within the periportal space, which leads to liver portal fibrosis and enlarged fibrotic portal tracts (Symmer's pipe stem fibrosis). The periportal fibrosis physically compress the portal vein leading to portal hypertension (increased portal venous pressure), increased pressure of the splenic vein, and subsequent enlargement of the spleen. Portal hypertension can also increase the pressure in portosystemic anastomoses (vessel connections between the portal circulation and systemic circulation) leading to esophageal varices and caput medusae. These portosystemic anastomoses also allows a pathway for the eggs to travel to locations such as the lungs, spinal cord, or brain. Co-infection with hepatitis is common in regions endemic to schistosomiasis with hepatitis B or hepatitis C, and co-infection with hepatitis C is associated with more rapid liver deterioration and worse outcomes. Fibrotic hepatic schistosomiasis caused by S. mansoni usually develops in around 5–15 years, however, this can take less time for S. japonicum.

Symptoms may include:

- Esophageal varices (can cause life-threatening esophageal variceal bleed)
- Ascites (end-stage)
- Caput medusae
- Enlarged spleen and liver

Complications may include:

- Neuroschistosomiasis due to portosystemic anastomoses from portal hypertension
- Pulmonary schistosomiasis due to portosystemic anastomoses from portal hypertension

==== Pulmonary schistosomiasis ====
Portal hypertension secondary to hepatosplenic schistosomiasis can cause vessel connections between the portal (liver and gut) circulation and systemic circulation to develop, which creates a pathway for the eggs and worms to travel to the lungs. The eggs can be deposited around the alveolar capillary beds and cause granulomatous inflammation of the pulmonary arterioles followed by fibrosis. This leads to high blood pressure in the pulmonary circulation system (pulmonary hypertension), increased pressure in the right heart, enlargement of the pulmonary artery and right atria, and thickening of the right ventricular wall.

Symptoms of pulmonary hypertension include shortness of breath, chest pain, lethargy, and fainting during physical exertion.

==== Urogenital schistosomiasis ====
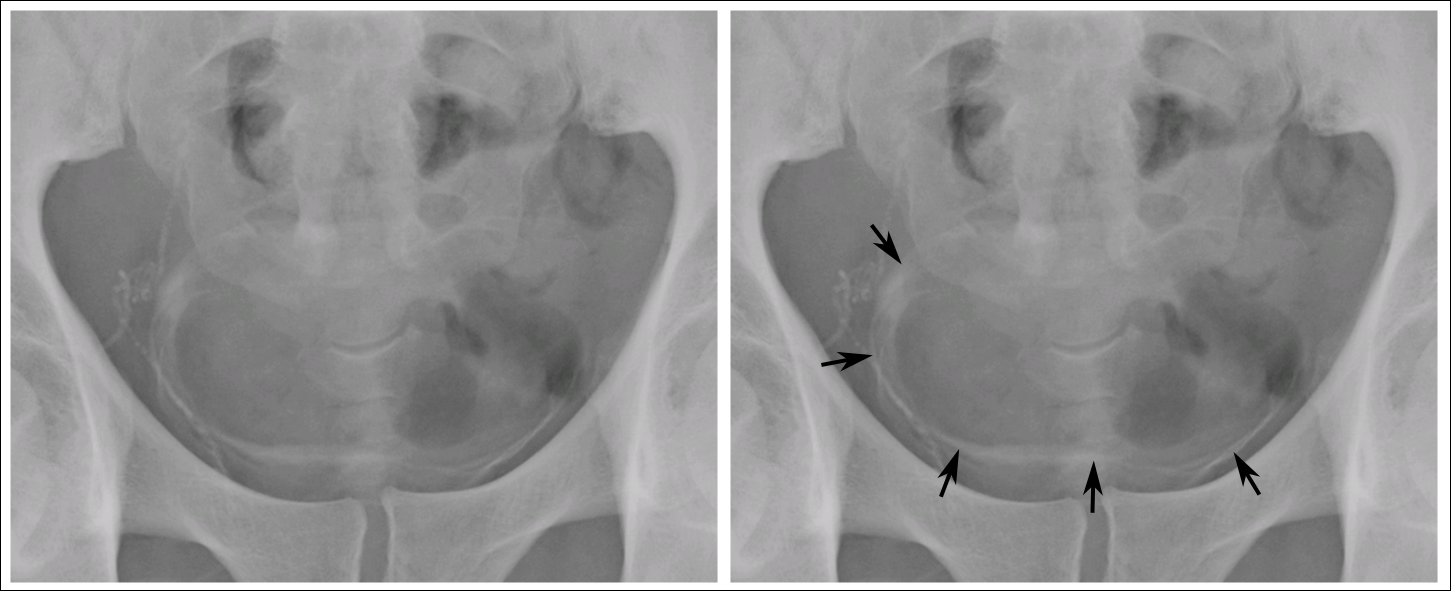
Calcification of the bladder wall caused by deposition of calcium around the Schistosoma eggs on a plain X-ray image of the pelvis, in a 44-year-old sub-Saharan man, due to urinary schistosomiasis

The worms of S. haematobium migrate to the veins around the bladder and ureters where they reproduce. S. haematobium can produce up to 3000 eggs per day. These eggs migrate from the veins to the bladder and ureter lumens, but up to 50 percent of them can become trapped in the surrounding tissues causing granulomatous inflammation, formation of polyps, and ulceration of bladder, ureter, and genital tract tissues. This can lead to blood in the urine (hematuria) 10 to 12 weeks after infection. Over time, fibrosis can lead to obstruction of the urinary tract, hydronephrosis, and kidney failure. S. haematobium is classified as group 1 biological carcinogen by International Agency for Research on Cancer. Bladder cancer diagnosis and mortality are generally elevated in affected areas; efforts to control schistosomiasis in Egypt have led to decreases in the bladder cancer rate. The risk of bladder cancer appears to be especially high in male smokers, perhaps due to chronic irritation of the bladder lining allowing it to be exposed to carcinogens from smoking.

In women, the genitourinary disease can also include genital lesions that may lead to increased rates of HIV transmission. If lesions involve the fallopian tubes or ovaries, it may lead to infertility. If the reproductive organs in males are affected, there could be blood in the sperm.

Urinary symptoms may include:

- Hematuria - blood is usually seen at the end of a urine stream (most common symptom)
- Painful urination (dysuria)
- Increase frequency of urination
- Protein in the urine (proteinuria)
- Secondary urinary tract infection
- Secondary kidney infection
- Calcification of the bladder wall

Genital symptoms may include:

- Inflammation and ulceration of uterine cervix, vagina, or vulva
- Blood in the sperm
- Infertility in females

Kidney function is unaffected in many cases, and the lesions are reversible with proper treatment to eliminate the worms.

==== Neuroschistosomiasis ====
Central nervous system lesions occur occasionally due to inflammation and granuloma development around eggs or worms that migrate to the brain or spinal cord through the circulatory system. They can potentially develop irreversible scarring without proper treatment. Cerebral granulomatous disease may be caused by S. japonicum eggs in the brain during the acute and chronic phases of the disease. Communities in China affected by S. japonicum have rates of seizures eight times higher than baseline. Cerebral granulomatous infection may also be caused by S. mansoni. in situ egg deposition following the anomalous migration of the adult worm, which appears to be the only mechanism by which Schistosoma can reach the central nervous system in people with schistosomiasis.

The destructive action on the nervous tissue and the mass effect produced by a large number of eggs surrounded by multiple, large granulomas in circumscribed areas of the brain characterize the pseudotumoral form of neuroschistosomiasis and are responsible for the appearance of clinical manifestations: headache, hemiparesis, altered mental status, vertigo, visual abnormalities, seizures, and ataxia. Similarly, granulomatous lesions from S. mansoni and S. haematobium eggs in the spinal cord can lead to transverse myelitis (inflammation of the spinal cord) with flaccid paraplegia. In cases with advanced hepatosplenic and urinary schistosomiasis, the continuous embolization of eggs from the portal mesenteric system (S. mansoni) or portal mesenteric-pelvic system (S. haematobium) to the brain, results in a sparse distribution of eggs associated with scant periovular inflammatory reaction, usually with little or no clinical significance.

Spinal cord inflammation (transverse myelitis) symptoms may include:

- Paralysis of the lower extremities
- Loss of bowel or urinary control
- Loss of sensation below the level of the lesion
- Pain below the level of the lesion

Cerebral granulomatous infection symptoms may include:

- Seizures
- Headaches
- Motor impairment
- Sensory impairment
- Unsteady gait
- Inability to stand or sit without support
- Uncoordinated movements
- Scanning speech
- Irregular eye movements

Corticosteroids are used to prevent permanent neurological damage from the inflammatory response to the eggs, and sometimes anticonvulsants are needed to stop the seizures. Corticosteroids are given prior to administration of praziquantel.

== Transmission and life cycle ==
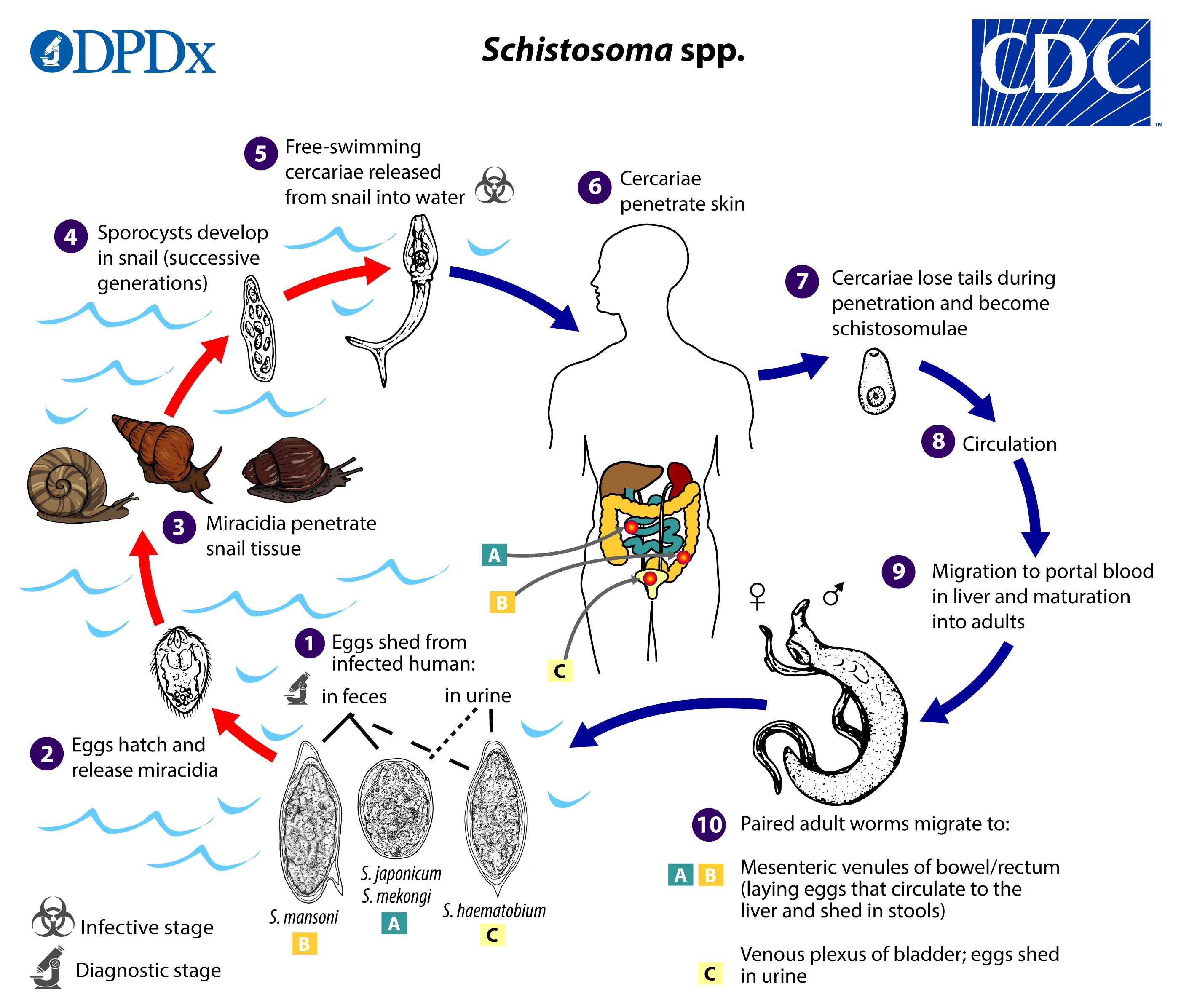
Life cycle of Schistosoma spp.

Individuals infected with Schistosoma release eggs into water via their feces or urine. A collection of stool samples under a microscope will show the eggs of S. intercalatum, S. mansoni, and S. japonicum. Looking at a urine sample under a microscope would reveal the eggs of S. haematobium and rarely, the eggs of S. mansoni. After larvae hatch from these eggs, the larvae infect a very specific type of freshwater snail. For example, in S. haematobium and S. intercalatum it is snails of the genus Bulinus, in S. mansoni it is Biomphalaria, and in S. japonicum it is Oncomelania. The schistosome larvae undergo the next phase of their lifecycles in these snails, spending their time reproducing and developing.

Once this step has been completed, the parasite leaves the snail and enters the water column. The parasite can live in the water for only 48 hours without a mammalian host. Once a host has been found, the worm enters its blood vessels. For several weeks, the worm remains in the vessels, continuing its development into its adult phase. When maturity is reached, mating occurs and eggs are produced. Eggs enter the bladder/intestine and are excreted through urine and feces and the process repeats. If the eggs are not excreted, they can become engrained in the body tissues and cause myriad problems such as immune reactions and organ damage. While transmission typically occurs only in countries where the freshwater snails are native, a case in Germany was reported where a man got schistosomiasis from an infected snail in his aquarium.

Humans encounter larvae of the schistosome parasite when they enter contaminated water while bathing, playing, swimming, washing, fishing, or walking through the water.

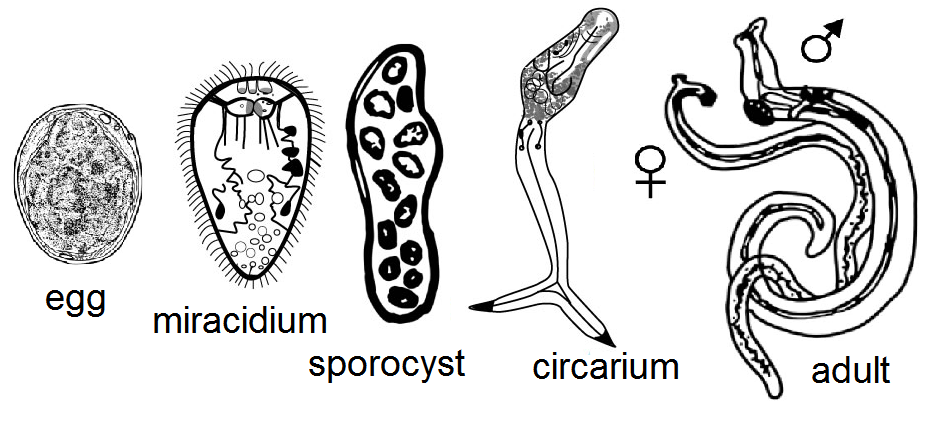
Lifecycle stages of a typical trematode, Schistosoma japonicum.

=== Life cycle ===
The life cycle stages are as follows:

1. The excretion of schistosome eggs in urine or feces depending on the species
2. The hatching of the eggs leads to the release of the free-swimming, ciliated larvae called miracidia
3. Miracidia find and penetrate the snails, which are the intermediate hosts (specific species of snails are dependent on the species of Schistosoma)
4. Within the snails, two successive generations of sporocysts occur
5. Sporocysts give rise to the infective free-swimming larvae with forked tails called cercariae, and they leave the snails to enter the water
6. Cercariae find the human hosts and penetrate their skin
7. Upon entrance into the human hosts, cercariae lose their tails and become schistosomulae
8. The schistosomulae travel to the lungs and heart via venous circulation
9. They migrate to the portal venous system of the liver where they mature into their adult form with two separate sexes
10. The adult male and female are paired together, exit the liver via the portal venous system, travel to the venous systems of the intestines or bladder (species dependent), and produce eggs.

Each species lays its eggs in specific parts of the body.

1. S. japonicum - superior mesenteric veins (but can also inhabit inferior mesenteric veins)
2. S. mansoni - inferior mesenteric veins (but can also inhabit superior mesenteric veins)
3. S. haematobium - vesicular and pelvic venous plexus of the bladder (occasionally rectal venules)
4. S. intercalatum and S. guineensis - inferior mesenteric plexus (lower portion of the bowels compared to S. mansoni)

Schistosomes can live an average of 3–5 years, and the eggs can survive for more than 30 years after infection.

=== Other hosts ===
Schistosomiasis is also a concern of cattle husbandry and mice. O-methylthreonine is weakly effective in mouse schistosomiasis but is not in use.

== Pathogenesis ==
The infectious stage starts when the free-swimming larval form of the schistosome, cercariae, penetrates the human skin using their suckers, proteolytic enzymes, and tail movements; the cercariae transformed into schistosomulae by losing its tail and subsequently travels to the heart and lungs through the venous system until it eventually reaches the liver where it will mature into the adult form. The diseases caused by the schistomes are characterized into acute schistosomiasis and chronic schistosomiasis, and can vary dependent on the species of schistosome. Infection induces type 2 immune responses.

=== Acute infection ===
Minutes to days after initial infection:

- Cercerial dermatitis (Swimmer's itch) - swimmer's itch is caused by a localized allergic reaction at the sites of skin penetration by the cercariae causing an inflammatory reaction that is characterized by itchy red pimples and blisters.

Weeks to months after initial infection:

- Acute Schistosomiasis (Katayama's Fever) - the exact pathophysiology of this disease remains unknown. It has been hypothesized to be caused by a systemic immune response due to immune complex formation (Type III hypersensivity) with the foreign antigens on the migratory schistosomula and the eggs and the subsequent deposition of these complexes on various tissues leading to activation of an autoimmune response. Acute schistosomiasis caused by S. mansoni and S. haematobium generally affect people who have been infected for the first time such as tourists visiting endemic regions. In contrast, cases of acute schistosomiasis caused by S. japonicum can occur in reinfection to population who reside in endemic regions, and they occur in higher incidences and can have worse prognosis. It was proposed that the large amount of egg antigens released by S. japonicum interact with antibodies leading to the formation of a high volume of immune complexes, which cause enlargement of the lymph tissues. This sequence of events can lead to clinical manifestation of fever, enlargement of the spleen and liver due to fibrosis, portal hypertension, and death.

=== Chronic infection ===
The clinical manifestations of chronic infection are mainly caused by immune reaction to the eggs' entrapment within tissues resulting in granuloma formation and chronic inflammation. Adult worms live together in pairs (one male and female), sexually reproduce, and lay eggs in the veins around the intestines and bladder depending on the species, and these eggs can rupture the wall of the veins to escape to the surrounding tissues. The eggs make their way through the tissues to the intestinal or bladder lumen with proteolytic enzymes, however, a large number of eggs are unable to finish their journey and remained stuck within the tissues where they can elicit an immune response. The miracidia in these eggs can release antigens that stimulate an inflammatory immune response. The miracidia within the eggs live for around 6–8 weeks before they die and stop releasing the antigens. The granulomatous response is a cellular immune response mediated by CD4^{+} T cells, neutrophils, eosinophils, lymphocytes, macrophages, and monocytes, and this chronic inflammatory response elicited by the eggs can cause fibrosis, tissue destruction, and granuloma nodules that disrupt the functions of the organs involved. Th1 helper cell response is prominent releasing cytokines such as IFN-γ during the early phases of infection, and it transitions to Th2 response leading to increase in level of IgE, IL-4, and eosinophils as egg production progresses. In chronic infections, the Th2 response shifts to increasing the level of IL-10, IL-13, and IgG4, which reverses the progression of the granulomas and leads to collagen deposition at the sites of the granulomas. The specific clinical symptoms and severity of the disease this causes depends on the type of schistosome infection, duration of infection, number of eggs, and the organ at which the eggs are deposited. The number of eggs entrapped in the tissues will continue to increase if the Schistosoma are not eliminated.

== Diagnosis ==
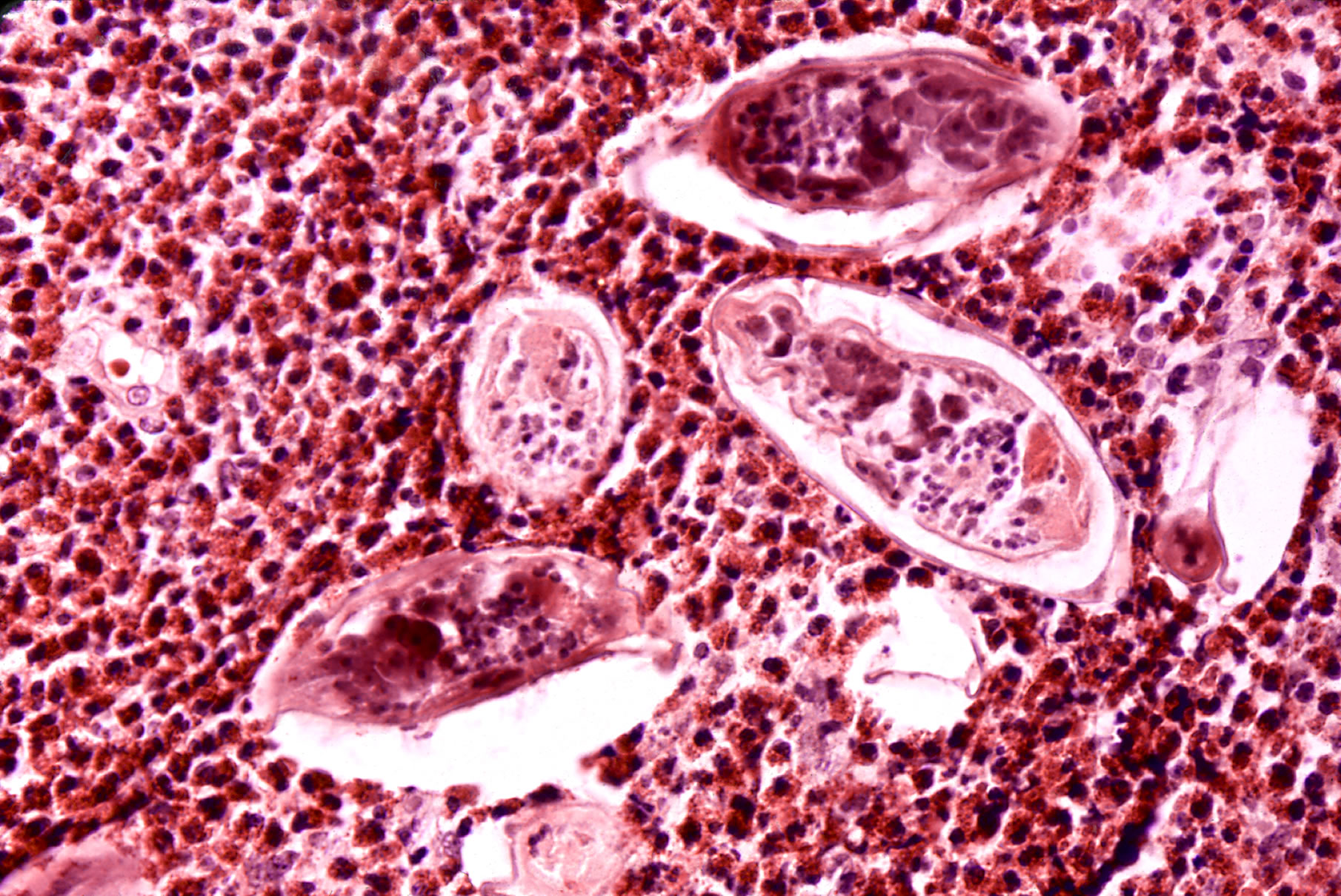
High-powered detailed micrograph of Schistosoma parasite eggs in human bladder tissue

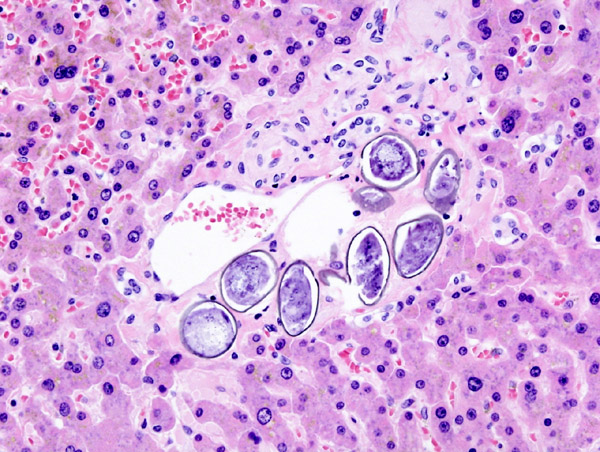
S. japonicum eggs in hepatic portal tract

=== Identification of eggs in stools ===
Diagnosis of infection is confirmed by the identification of eggs in stools. Eggs of S. mansoni are about 140 by 60 μm in size and have a lateral spine. The diagnosis is improved through the use of the Kato-Katz technique, a semiquantitative stool examination technique. Other methods that can be used are enzyme-linked immunosorbent assay, circumoval precipitation test, and alkaline phosphatase immunoassay.

Microscopic identification of eggs in stool or urine is the most practical method for diagnosis. A stool examination should be performed when infection with S. mansoni or S. japonicum is suspected, and a urine examination should be performed if S. haematobium is suspected. Eggs can be present in the stool in infections with all Schistosoma species. The examination can be performed on a simple smear (1 to 2 mg of fecal material). Because eggs may be passed intermittently or in small numbers, their detection is enhanced by repeated examinations or concentration procedures, or both. In addition, for field surveys and investigational purposes, the egg output can be quantified by using the Kato-Katz technique (20 to 50 mg of fecal material) or the Ritchie technique. Eggs can be found in the urine in infections with S. haematobium (recommended time for collection: between noon and 3 PM) and with S. japonicum. Quantification is possible by using filtration through a nucleopore filter membrane of a standard volume of urine followed by egg counts on the membrane. Tissue biopsy (rectal biopsy for all species and biopsy of the bladder for S. haematobium) may demonstrate eggs when stool or urine examinations are negative.

Confirming microhematuria in urine using urine reagent strips is more accurate than circulating antigen tests to identify active schistosomiasis in endemic areas.

=== Antibody detection ===
Antibody detection can be useful to indicate schistosome infection in people who have traveled to areas where schistosomiasis is common and in whom eggs cannot be demonstrated in fecal or urine specimens. Test sensitivity and specificity vary widely among the many tests reported for the serologic diagnosis of schistosomiasis and depend on the type of antigen preparations used (crude, purified, adult worm, egg, cercarial) and the test procedure.

At the U.S. Centers for Disease Control and Prevention, a combination of tests with purified adult worm antigens is used for antibody detection. All serum specimens are tested by FAST-ELISA using S. mansoni adult microsomal antigen. A positive reaction (greater than 9 units/μL serum) indicates infection with Schistosoma species. Sensitivity for S. mansoni infection is 99%, 95% for S. haematobium infection, and less than 50% for S. japonicum infection. The specificity of this assay for detecting schistosome infection is 99%. Because test sensitivity with the FAST-ELISA is reduced for species other than S. mansoni, immunoblots of the species appropriate to the person's travel history are also tested to ensure detection of S. haematobium and S. japonicum infections. Immunoblots with adult worm microsomal antigens are species-specific, so a positive reaction indicates the infecting species. The antibody's presence only indicates that schistosome infection occurred at some time and cannot be correlated with clinical status, worm burden, egg production, or prognosis. Where a person has traveled can help determine which Schistosoma species to test for by immunoblot.

In 2005, a field evaluation of a novel handheld microscope was undertaken in Uganda for the diagnosis of intestinal schistosomiasis by a team led by Russell Stothard from the Natural History Museum of London, working with the Schistosomiasis Control Initiative, London.

=== Molecular diagnostics ===
Polymerase chain reaction (PCR) based testing is accurate and rapid. However, it is not frequently used in countries where the disease is common due to the cost of the equipment and the technical expertise required to run the tests. Using a microscope to detect eggs costs about US$0.40 per test whereas PCR is about $US 7 per test as of 2019. Loop-mediated isothermal amplification are being studied as they are lower cost. LAMP testing is not commercially available as of 2019.

=== Laboratory testing ===
S. haematobium screening in the community can be done by using urine dip-stick to check for hematuria, and the stool guaiac test can be used to test for blood in the stool for potential S. mansoni and S. japonicum infection. For travelers or migrants in endemic regions, complete blood count with differential can be used to identify a high level of eosinophil in the blood, which could be indicative of an acute infection. Liver function test can be ordered if hepatosplenic schistosomiasis is suspected, and a subsequent hepatitis test panel can be ordered if liver function test is abnormal.

Like most parasitic infections, schistosomiasis will usually cause significant eosinophilia that can be identified on a complete blood count with differential.

=== Tissue biopsy ===
If other diagnostic methods of schistosomiasis have failed to detect the infection, but there is still a high suspicion for schistosomiasis, tissue biopsy from the rectum, bladder, and liver can be obtained to look for schistosome eggs within the tissue samples.

=== Imaging ===
Imaging modalities such as X-rays, ultrasound, computed tomography (CT), and magnetic resonance imaging (MRI) can be utilized to evaluate for severity of schistosomiasis and damages of the infected organs. For example, X-ray and CT scans of the chest can be used to detect lesions in the lungs from pulmonary schistosomiasis, and pelvic X-ray can reveal calcification of the bladder in chronic urinary schistosomiasis. Ultrasound may be used to look for abnormalities in the liver and spleen in hepatosplenic schistosomiasis, and CT scan of the liver is a good tool to look for calcification in the liver associated with S. japonicum infection. CT scan can also be used to assess damages from the schistosomiasis infection in the intestinal, urogenital, and central nervous system. MRI is used to evaluate schistosomiasis of the central nervous system, liver, and genital.

PET/CT scans that identify tissues with higher metabolic activity have been used to help diagnose schistosomiasis in rare cases. This is due to the high level of inflammation caused by the schistosomal eggs, which increases the metabolic rate of the surrounding tissues.

== Prevention ==
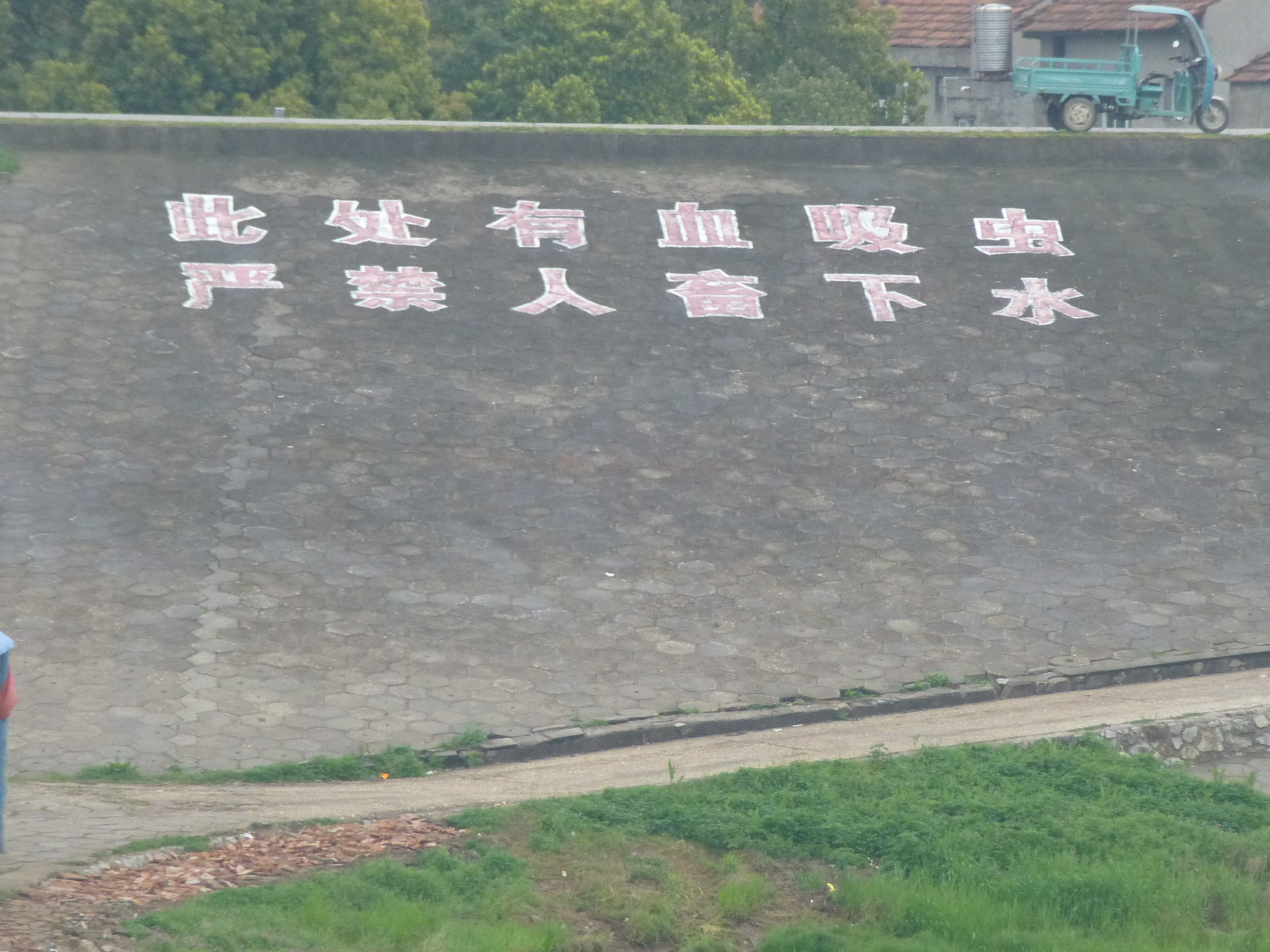
"Schistosomes are here. People and livestock are strictly prohibited from entering the water!" A warning painted on a Yangtze levee in Honghu, Hubei, China

Many countries are working towards eradicating the disease. The World Health Organization is promoting these efforts. In some cases, urbanization, pollution, and the consequent destruction of snail habitat have reduced exposure, with a subsequent decrease in new infections. The elimination of snail populations using molluscicides had been attempted to prevent schistosomiasis in the past, but it was an expensive process that often only reduced but did not eliminate the snail population. The drug praziquantel is used for prevention in high-risk populations living in areas where the disease is common. The Centers for Disease Control and Prevention advises avoiding drinking or coming into contact with contaminated water in areas where schistosomiasis is common.

A 2014 review found tentative evidence that increasing access to clean water and sanitation reduces schistosome infection.

Other important preventive measures include hygiene education leading to behavioral change and sanitary engineering to ensure a safe water supply.

=== Preventive anthelminthic administration ===
For schistosomiasis control, the World Health Organization recommends preventive anthelminthic administration, which is the treatment of an entire affected population and the periodic treatment of all groups at high risk of acquiring schistosomiasis by using Praziquantel. In 2019, 44.5% of people with schistosomiasis were treated globally, and 67.2% of school-aged children needing preventive chemotherapy received treatment.

=== Snails, dams, and prawns ===
For many years from the 1950s onwards, vast dams and irrigation schemes were constructed, causing a massive rise in water-borne infections from schistosomiasis. The detailed specifications in various United Nations documents since the 1950s could have minimized this problem. Irrigation schemes can be designed to make it hard for the snails to colonize the water and to reduce contact with the local population. Even though guidelines on how to design these schemes to minimise the spread of the disease had been published years before, the designers were unaware of them. The dams appear to have reduced the population of the large migratory prawn Macrobrachium, which eats the snails. After the construction of fourteen large dams, greater increases in schistosomiasis occurred in the historical habitats of native prawns than in other areas. Further, at the 1986 Diama Dam on the Senegal River, restoring prawns upstream of the dam reduced both snail density and the human schistosomiasis reinfection rate.

=== Integrated strategy in China ===
In China, the national strategy for schistosomiasis control has shifted three times since it was first initiated: transmission control strategy (from mid-1950s to early 1980s), morbidity control strategy (from mid-1980s to 2003), and the "new integrated strategy" (2004 to present). The morbidity control strategy focused on synchronous chemotherapy for humans and bovines and the new strategy developed in 2004 intervenes in the transmission pathway of schistosomiasis, mainly including replacement of bovines with machines, prohibition of grazing cattle in the grasslands, improving sanitation, installation of fecal-matter containers on boats, praziquantel drug therapy, snail control, and health education. A 2018 review found that the "new integrated strategy" was highly effective in reducing the rate of S. japonicum infection in both humans and the intermediate host snails and reduced the infection risk by 3–4 times relative to the conventional strategy.

== Treatment ==
Schistosomiasis treatment coverage

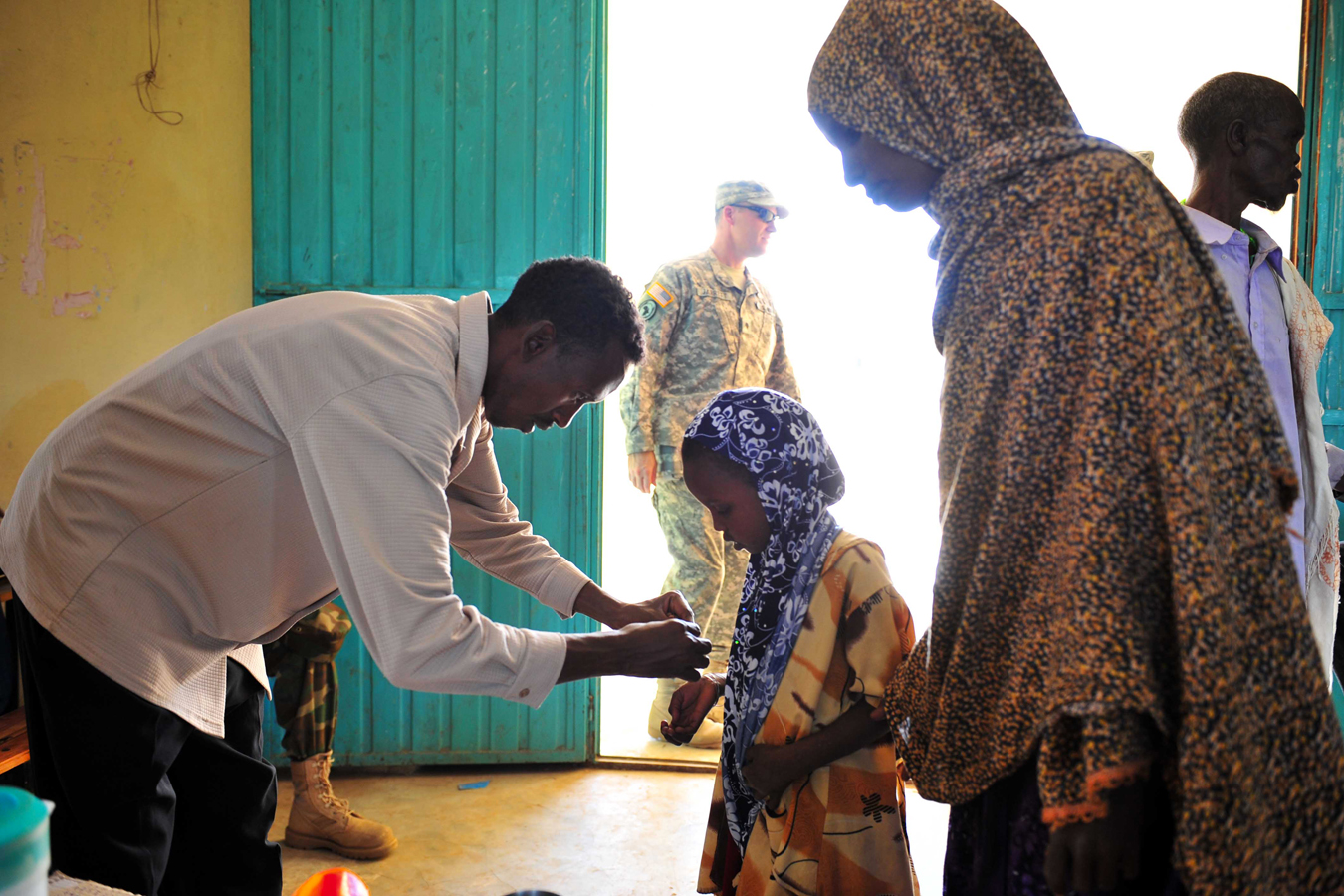
Ethiopian children treated for Schistosoma mansoni

Two drugs, praziquantel and oxamniquine, are available for the treatment of schistosomiasis. They are considered equivalent in relation to efficacy against S. mansoni and safety. Historically, antimony potassium tartrate remained the treatment of choice for schistosomiasis until the development of praziquantel in the 1980s. Because of praziquantel's lower cost per treatment and oxaminiquine's lack of efficacy against the urogenital form of the disease caused by S. haematobium, praziquantel is generally considered the first option for treatment. Praziquantel can be safely used in pregnant women and young children. The treatment objective is to cure the disease and prevent the progression of the acute to chronic form of the disease. All cases of suspected schistosomiasis should be treated regardless of presentation because the adult parasite can live in the host for years.

Schistosomiasis is treatable by taking a single dose of the drug praziquantel by mouth annually.

Praziquantel eliminates the adult schistosomes but does not kill the eggs and immature worms. Live eggs can be excreted by the infected individuals for weeks after treatment with praziquantel. The immature worms can survive and grow into adult schistosomes after praziquantel therapy. Thus, it is important to have repeated schistosomiasis testing of the stool and/or urine around 4–6 weeks after praziquantel therapy. Praziquantel treatment may be repeated to ensure complete parasite elimination.

The WHO has developed guidelines for community treatment based on the impact the disease has on children in villages in which it is common:

- When a village reports more than 50 percent of children have blood in their urine, everyone in the village receives treatment.
- When 20 to 50 percent of children have bloody urine, only school-age children are treated.
- When fewer than 20 percent of children have symptoms, mass treatment is not implemented.

Other possible treatments include a combination of praziquantel with metrifonate, artesunate, or mefloquine. A Cochrane review found tentative evidence that when used alone, metrifonate was as effective as praziquantel. Mefloquine, which has previously been used to treat and prevent malaria, was recognised in 2008–2009 to be effective against schistosomes.

Post-treatment monitoring Osteopontin (OPN) is a promising tool for monitoring praziquantel efficacy and post-treatment fibrosis regression as (OPN) expression is modulated by S. mansoni egg antigens and its levels correlate with the severity of schistosomiasis fibrosis and portal hypertension in mice and humans. Praziquantel pharmacotherapy reduces systemic OPN levels and liver collagen content in mice.

== Epidemiology ==
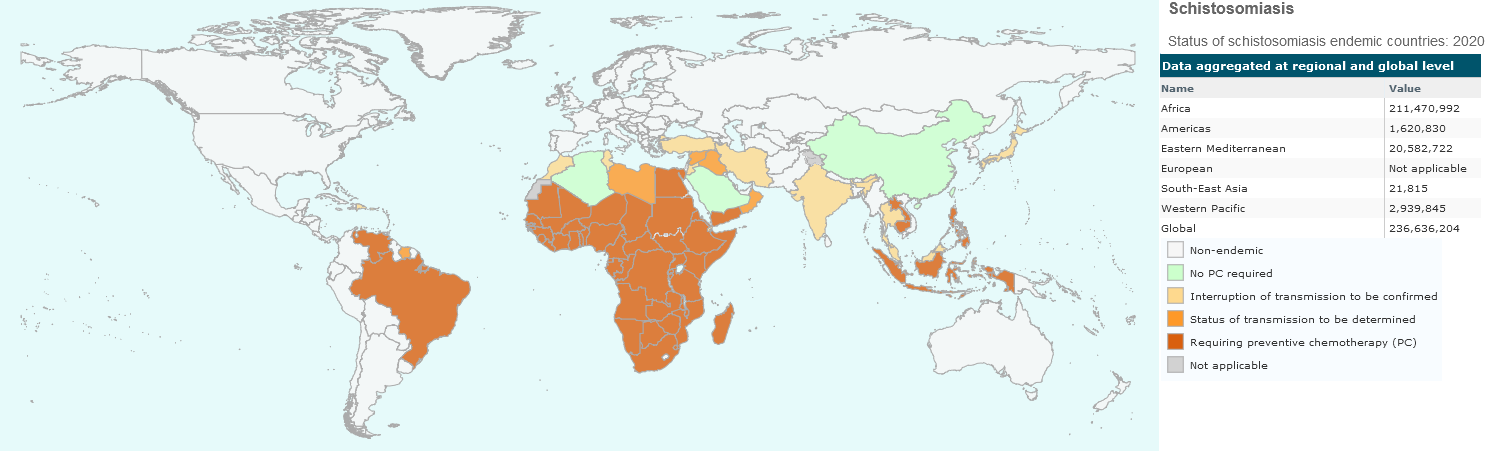
Geographic representation of Schistosomiasis endemic countries and their preventive chemotherapy requirement status in the year of 2020 from the World Health Organization.

Deaths from schistosomiasis per million persons in 2012 no data 0–1 1–2 3–4 5–13 14–15 16–18 19–21 22–24 25–28 29–40

Disability-adjusted life year for schistosomiasis per 100,000 inhabitants. no data less than 50 50–75 75–100 100–150 150–200 200–250 250–300 300–350 350–400 400–450 450–500 more than 500

The disease is found in tropical countries in Africa, the Caribbean, eastern South America, Southeast Asia, and the Middle East. S. mansoni is found in parts of South America and the Caribbean, Africa, and the Middle East; S. haematobium in Africa and the Middle East; and S. japonicum in the Far East. S. mekongi and S. intercalatum are found locally in Southeast Asia and central West Africa, respectively.

The disease is endemic in about 75 developing countries and mainly affects people living in rural agricultural and peri-urban areas.

Schistosoma species and endemic regions
Type of infection	Species	Location
Intestinal	Schistosoma mansoni	Africa, Middle East, Caribbean, Brazil, Venezuela, Suriname
Intestinal	Schistosoma japonicum	China, Indonesia, Philippines
Intestinal	Schistosoma mekongi	Cambodia, Laos
Intestinal	Schistosoma guineensis	Central Africa rain forest
Intestinal	Schistosoma intercalatum	Central Africa rain forest
Urogenital	Schistosoma haematobium	Africa, Middle East, Corsica

=== Infection estimates ===
In 2010, approximately 238 million people were infected with schistosomiasis, 85 percent of whom live in Africa. An earlier estimate from 2006 had put the figure at 200 million people infected. As of the latest WHO record, 236.6 million people were infected in 2019. In many affected areas, schistosomiasis infects a large proportion of children under 14 years of age. An estimated 600 to 700 million people worldwide are at risk from the disease because they live in countries where the organism is common. In 2012, 249 million people needed treatment to prevent the disease. This likely makes it the most common parasitic infection with malaria second and causing about 207 million cases in 2013.

S. haematobium, the infectious agent responsible for urogenital schistosomiasis, infects over 112 million people annually in Sub-Saharan Africa alone. It is responsible for 32 million cases of dysuria, 10 million cases of hydronephrosis, and 150,000 deaths from kidney failure annually, making S. haematobium the world's deadliest schistosome.

=== Deaths ===
Estimates regarding the number of deaths vary. Worldwide, the Global Burden of Disease Study issued in 2010 estimated 12,000 direct deaths while the WHO in 2014 estimated more than 200,000 annual deaths related to schistosomiasis. According to the Global Burden of Disease Study 2021, the number of deaths related to schistosomiasis in 2021 was 12,858 people. Another 20 million have severe consequences from the disease. It is the most deadly of the neglected tropical diseases.

== History ==
The most ancient evidence of schistosomiasis dates back to more than 6,000 years ago. Studies conducted on human skeletal remains found in northern Syria (5800–4000 BC) demonstrated evidence of a terminal spined schistosome from the pelvic sediment of skeletal remains. Even though this evidence comes from the Middle East, it has been suggested that the 'cradle' of schistosomes lies in the region of the African Great Lakes, an area in which both the parasites and their intermediate hosts are in an active state of evolution. Subsequently, it is believed that schistosomiasis spread to Egypt as a result of the importation of monkeys and slaves during the reign of the fifth dynasty of the Pharaohs (ca. 2494–2345 BC).

Schistosomiasis is known as bilharzia or bilharziosis in many countries, after German physician Theodor Bilharz, who first described the cause of urinary schistosomiasis in 1851.

The first physician who described the entire disease cycle was the Brazilian parasitologist Pirajá da Silva in 1908. The earliest case known of infection was discovered in 2014, belonging to a child who lived 6,200 years ago.

The disease was a common cause of death for Egyptians in the Greco-Roman Period.

In 2016, more than 200 million people needed treatment, but only 88 million people were actually treated for schistosomiasis.

=== Etymology ===
Schistosomiasis is named for the genus of parasitic flatworm Schistosoma, a term which means 'split body'. The name Bilharzia comes from Theodor Bilharz, a German pathologist working in Egypt in 1851 who first discovered these worms. The name Katayama disease comes from the Katayama district of Hiroshima Prefecture in Japan, where schistosomiasis was once endemic.

== Prevalence in Egypt ==
Because of its prevalence in Egypt dating back millenia, the schistosomiasis symptom of blood in the urine was considered to be the male version of menstruation, and was still viewed as a rite of passage for boys in the early 20th century.

The prevalence of Schistosomiasis in Egypt was exacerbated by the country's dam and irrigation projects along the Nile river. From the late 1950s through the early 1980s, infected villagers were treated with repeated injections of tartar emetic. Epidemiological evidence suggests that this campaign unintentionally contributed to the spread of hepatitis C via unclean needles. Egypt has the world's highest hepatitis C infection rate, and the infection rates in various regions of the country closely track the timing and intensity of the anti-schistosomiasis campaign.

Among human parasitic diseases, schistosomiasis ranks second behind malaria in socio-economic and public health importance in tropical and subtropical areas.

== Research ==
A proposed vaccine against S. haematobium infection called "Bilhvax" underwent a phase 3 clinical trial among children in Senegal. The results, reported in 2018, showed that it was ineffective despite provoking some immune response. Using CRISPR gene editing technology, researchers decreased the symptoms due to schistosomiasis in an animal model.

Using thromboelastography, researchers at Tufts University observed that murine blood incubated by adult worms for one hour has a coagulation profile similar to that of patients that have hemophilia or on anti-coagulant drugs, suggesting that schistosomes could possess anti-coagulant properties. Inhibiting schistosome activity in blood coagulation could potentially serve as a therapeutic option for schistosomiasis.

== See also ==
- Angiostrongyliasis, another disease transmitted by snails
