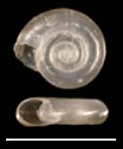
- apical and apertural view of the shell of Biomphalaria havanensis

Conservation status
- Secure (NatureServe)

Scientific classification
- Kingdom: Animalia
- Phylum: Mollusca
- Class: Gastropoda
- Superorder: Hygrophila
- Family: Planorbidae
- Genus: Biomphalaria
- Species: B. havanensis

Binomial name
- Biomphalaria havanensis (L. Pfeiffer, 1839)

= Biomphalaria havanensis =

Ghost rams-horn

Species of gastropod

Biomphalaria havanensis, common name the ghost rams-horn, is a species of air-breathing freshwater snail, an aquatic pulmonate gastropod mollusk in the family Planorbidae, the ram's horn snails.

The shell of this species, like all planorbids is sinistral in coiling, but is carried upside down and thus appears to be dextral.

== Distribution ==
Biomphalaria havanensis is a Neotropical species.

Distribution of Biomphalaria havanensis include:

- Cuba

It was found as a native transplant in:

- pond near Snake River in Twin Falls County, Idaho in 1991.
- Guadalupe River, Kerr County, Texas

== Phylogeny ==
A cladogram showing phylogenic relations of species in the genus Biomphalaria:

- Biomphalaria
  - - - - - - - - - Biomphalaria stanleyi
                  - Biomphalaria pfeifferi
                - Biomphalaria camerunensis
              - Nilotic species complex
                - - - Biomphalaria sudanica
                    - Biomphalaria choanomphala
                  - Biomphalaria alexandrina
                - Biomphalaria smithi
            - Biomphalaria glabrata
          - - - - Biomphalaria straminea complex
                  - - Biomphalaria kuhniana
                    - Biomphalaria straminea
                  - - Biomphalaria straminea
                    - Biomphalaria intermedia
                - - Biomphalaria amazonica
                  - Biomphalaria sp.
              - - Biomphalaria tenagophila
                - Biomphalaria occidentalis
            - - - Biomphalaria prona
                - Biomphalaria andecola
              - Biomphalaria sp. (? Biomphalaria havanensis)
        - - - Biomphalaria sp. (? Biomphalaria havanensis)
            - Biomphalaria temascalensis
          - Biomphalaria obstructa
      - Biomphalaria helophila
    - Biomphalaria peregrina
  - Biomphalaria schrammi
