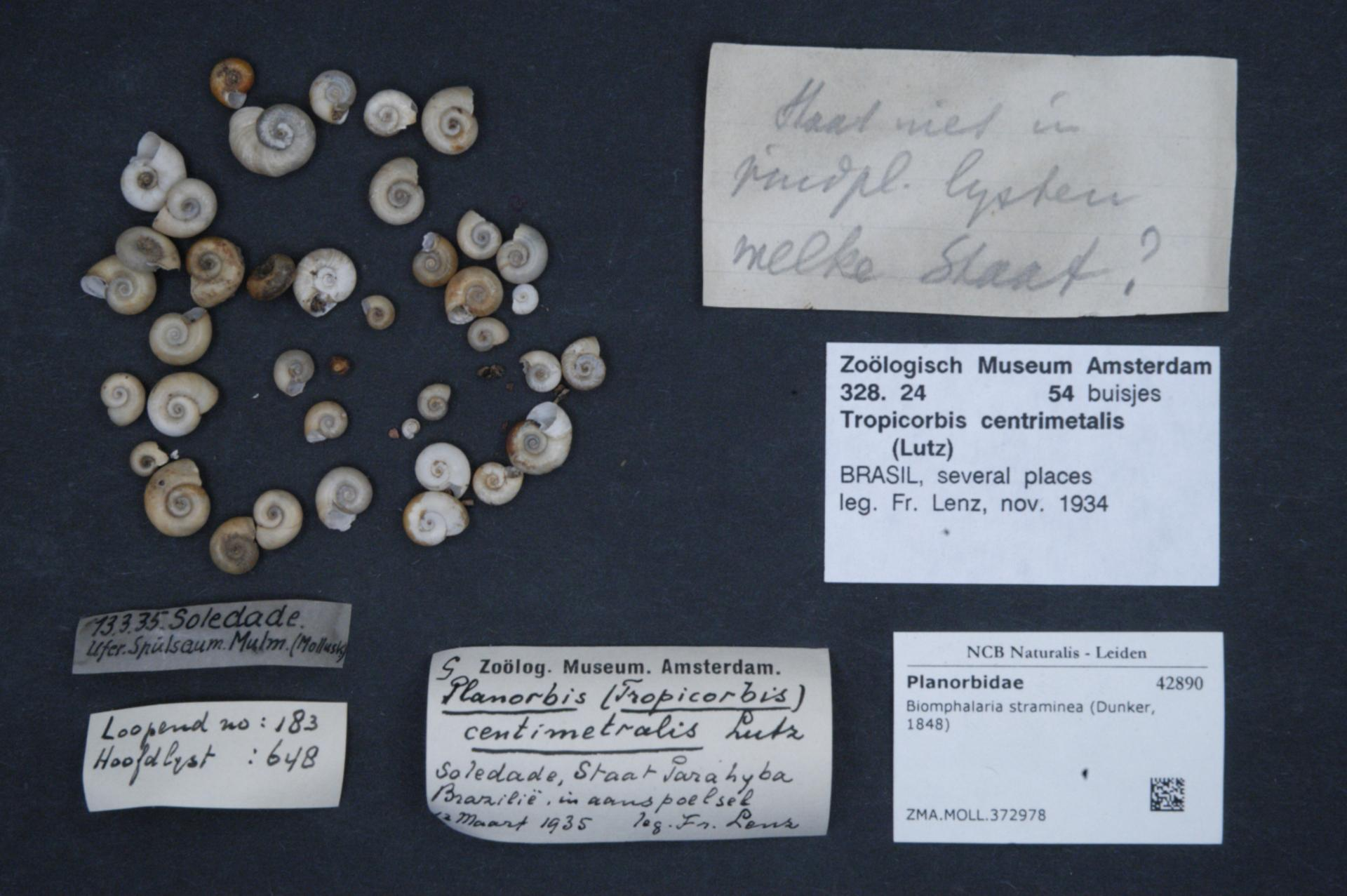
- Shells of Biomphalaria straminea

Scientific classification
- Kingdom: Animalia
- Phylum: Mollusca
- Class: Gastropoda
- Superorder: Hygrophila
- Family: Planorbidae
- Genus: Biomphalaria
- Species: B. straminea

Binomial name
- Biomphalaria straminea (Dunker, 1848)

Synonyms
- Planorbis stramineus

= Biomphalaria straminea =

Species of gastropod

Biomphalaria straminea is a species of air-breathing freshwater snail, an aquatic pulmonate gastropod mollusk in the family Planorbidae, the ram's horn snails.

This snail is a medically important pest, because an intermediate host for the parasite Schistosoma mansoni and a vector of schistosomiasis.

The history of these discoveries was summarized by Paraense (2001).

The shell of this species, like all planorbids is sinistral in coiling, but is carried upside down and thus appears to be dextral.

== Distribution ==
Biomphalaria glabrata is a Neotropical species. It occurs in:

- Caribbean: Saint Lucia – reported since 1993
- northeast of Brazil

This species has recently expanded its native range. As an introduced species, it occurs in:

- Hong Kong and Southern China - firstly collected in 1973 in the Lam Tsuen valley in Hong Kong, in has now been identified at a number of locations in Hong Kong and Guangdong Province.

== Phylogeny ==
To allow comparisons with other mollusc genomes, a high-quality genome assembly for B. straminea together with accompanying transcriptomes has been sequenced, producing a 1.005 Gb in size reference genome consisting of 36 chromosomes.

A cladogram showing phylogenic relations of species in the genus Biomphalaria:

- Biomphalaria
  - - - - - - - - - Biomphalaria stanleyi
                  - Biomphalaria pfeifferi
                - Biomphalaria camerunensis
              - Nilotic species complex
                - - - Biomphalaria sudanica
                    - Biomphalaria choanomphala
                  - Biomphalaria alexandrina
                - Biomphalaria smithi
            - Biomphalaria glabrata
          - - - - Biomphalaria straminea complex
                  - - Biomphalaria kuhniana
                    - Biomphalaria straminea
                  - - Biomphalaria straminea
                    - Biomphalaria intermedia
                - - Biomphalaria amazonica
                  - Biomphalaria sp.
              - - Biomphalaria tenagophila
                - Biomphalaria occidentalis
            - - - Biomphalaria prona
                - Biomphalaria andecola
              - Biomphalaria sp. (? Biomphalaria havanensis)
        - - - Biomphalaria sp. (? Biomphalaria havanensis)
            - Biomphalaria temascalensis
          - Biomphalaria obstructa
      - Biomphalaria helophila
    - Biomphalaria peregrina
  - Biomphalaria schrammi

== Parasites ==
Biomphalaria straminea is an intermediate host for Schistosoma mansoni and a vector of intestinal schistosomiasis. Schistosoma mansoni came to Neotropics from Africa in context of the slave trade. Schistosoma mansoni was not able to infect Biomphalaria straminea previously and it has adapted to this host.
