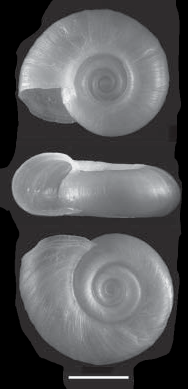
- Apical, apertural and umbilical views of the shell of Biomphalaria tenagophila. Scale bar is 3 mm.

Scientific classification
- Kingdom: Animalia
- Phylum: Mollusca
- Class: Gastropoda
- Superorder: Hygrophila
- Family: Planorbidae
- Genus: Biomphalaria
- Species: B. tenagophila

Binomial name
- Biomphalaria tenagophila (Orbigny, 1835)

Synonyms
- Planorbis tenagophilus Orbigny, 1835; Taphius tenagophilus (Orbigny, 1835); Australorbis tenagophilus (Orbigny, 1835); Planorbis nigricans; Australorbis nigricans (Spix, 1827)

= Biomphalaria tenagophila =

Species of gastropod

Biomphalaria tenagophila is a species of air-breathing freshwater snail, an aquatic pulmonate gastropod mollusk in the family Planorbidae, the ram's horn snails.

This species is medically important pest, because of transferring the disease intestinal schistosomiasis. (Intestinal schistosomiasis is the most widespread of all types of schistosomiasis).

The parasite Schistosoma mansoni, which Biomphalaria snails carry, infects about 83.31 million people worldwide.

The shell of this species, like all planorbids is sinistral in coiling, but is carried upside down and thus appears to be dextral.

== Taxonomy ==
Biomphalaria tenagophila was originally discovered and described under the name Planorbis tenagophilus by the French naturalist Alcide d'Orbigny in 1835. Orbigny (1835) referred its distribution to Corrientes Province, Argentina and to Santa Cruz Department, Bolivia (referred as "Santa-Cruz et Chiquitos"). But Orbigny himself later limited its distribution to Ensenada, Buenos Aires Province, Argentina in 1837.

Subspecies recognized in this species include:

- Biomphalaria tenagophila tenagophila (d'Orbigny, 1835)
- Biomphalaria tenagophila guaibensis Paraense, 1984 – Biomphalaria tenagophila guaibensis can be distinguished from the nominal subspecies according to the details on the reproductive system only.

There are also three "old-style" proposals of subspecies, based on shell characteristics:

- Planorbis tenagophilus chemnitziana Beck, 1837 – this name is based on the catalog for the shell in Museum of Copenhagen, but without description.
- Planorbis tenagophilus orbignyana Beck, 1837 – the same situation as in P. t. chemnitziana
- Australorbis bahiensis megas Pilsbry, 1951

History of discoveries summarized Paraense (2001).

== Phylogeny ==
A cladogram showing phylogenic relations of species in the genus Biomphalaria:

- Biomphalaria
  - - - - - - - - - Biomphalaria stanleyi
                  - Biomphalaria pfeifferi
                - Biomphalaria camerunensis
              - Nilotic species complex
                - - - Biomphalaria sudanica
                    - Biomphalaria choanomphala
                  - Biomphalaria alexandrina
                - Biomphalaria smithi
            - Biomphalaria glabrata
          - - - - Biomphalaria straminea complex
                  - - Biomphalaria kuhniana
                    - Biomphalaria straminea
                  - - Biomphalaria straminea
                    - Biomphalaria intermedia
                - - Biomphalaria amazonica
                  - Biomphalaria sp.
              - - Biomphalaria tenagophila
                - Biomphalaria occidentalis
            - - - Biomphalaria prona
                - Biomphalaria andecola
              - Biomphalaria sp. (? Biomphalaria havanensis)
        - - - Biomphalaria sp. (? Biomphalaria havanensis)
            - Biomphalaria temascalensis
          - Biomphalaria obstructa
      - Biomphalaria helophila
    - Biomphalaria peregrina
  - Biomphalaria schrammi

== Distribution ==
Biomphalaria tenagophila is a Neotropical species and its native distribution include Peru, Brazil, Uruguay and Argentina.

This species has recently expanded its native range.

The non-indigenous distribution of Biomphalaria tenagophila includes a hypothermal spring near Răbăgani, Romania (46°45´1.3´´N, 22°12´44.8´´E).

== Shell description ==
The shell is sinistrally coiled (has left-handed coiling). The flat shells are yellow-brown, discoidal, deeply and symmetrically biconcave, and consist of 5 or 6 slowly increasing whorls. The last whorl is rounded; the intermediate whorls are slightly angled on the left side. The aperture is circular or slightly ovate and angled toward the left side of the shell (i.e., toward the upper surface on the bottom right shell). Fine, parallel, rib-like transverse lines can be seen on the outer surface of the whorls.

The width of the shell is usually from 11 to 13 mm, but in the largest individuals, the shell can reach 21 mm in width, 6.5 mm in height and have 6.5 whorls.

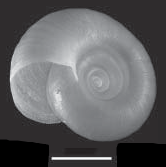
A shell of Biomphalaria tenagophila.

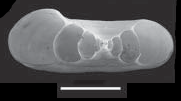
A cross section of apertural view of the shell of Biomphalaria tenagophila. The shell is sinistral in coiling, thus the sunken spire is on top and the umbilicus at the bottom in this image

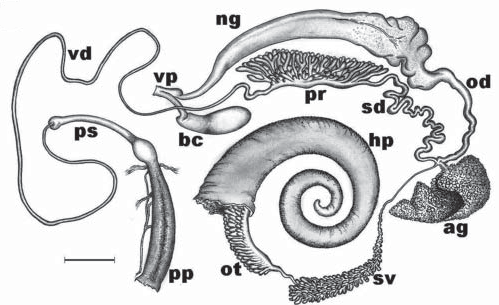
Reproductive system of Biomphalaria tenagophila. Scale bar is 1 mm. ag – albumin gland bc – bursa copulatrix hp – distal part of the hepatopancreas ng – nidamental gland od – oviduct ot – ovotestis pp – preputium pr – prostate ps – penis sheath sd – spermiduct sv – seminal vesicles vd – vas deferens vp – vaginal pouch.

== Anatomy ==
The anatomy of this species was firstly published under the synonym Australorbis nigricans in 1955.

The body length varies from 56 mm to 64 mm.

The radula has from 125 to 168 rows of denticles (tiny teeth). The number of lateral teeth varying from 28 to 36. The mode radula formula is 31-0-31.

The specific characteristics of the reproductive system of Biomphalaria tenagophila are: more than 200 diverticulae of the ovotestis; 7–11 main lobes of the prostate; and presence of vaginal pouch.

== Ecology ==
Habitat of Biomphalaria tenagophila is tropical standing water or freshwater.

Biomphalaria tenagophila is an intermediate host for Schistosoma mansoni and a vector of schistosomiasis. Schistosoma mansoni came to Neotropics from Africa in context of the slave trade. Schistosoma mansoni was not able to infect Biomphalaria tenagophila in 1916 and it has adapted to this host since 1916.

Experimental parasites include:

- Angiostrongylus vasorum – (experimental)
