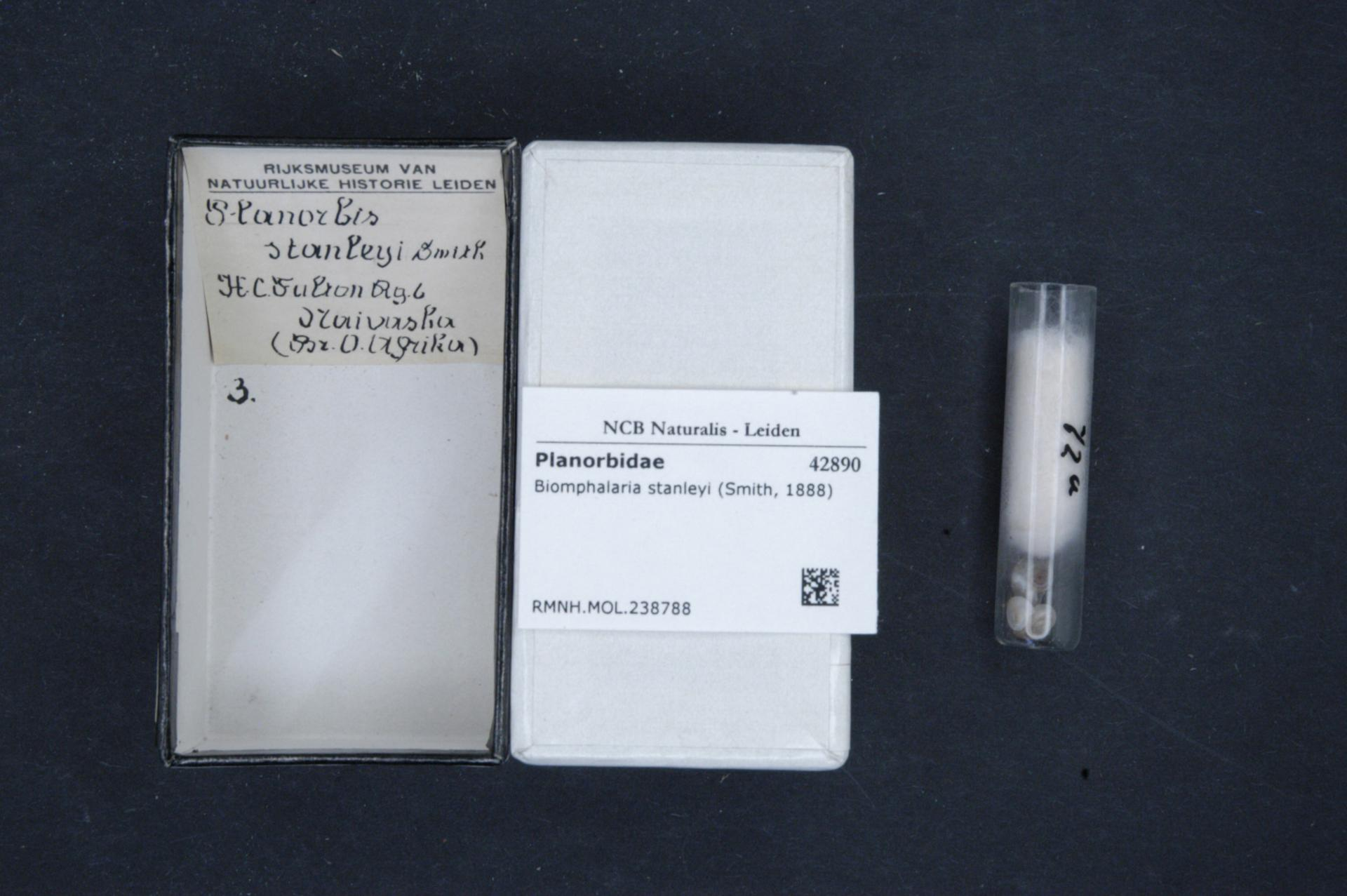

Conservation status
- Near Threatened (IUCN 3.1)

Scientific classification
- Kingdom: Animalia
- Phylum: Mollusca
- Class: Gastropoda
- Superorder: Hygrophila
- Family: Planorbidae
- Genus: Biomphalaria
- Species: B. stanleyi

Binomial name
- Biomphalaria stanleyi (Smith, 1888)

Synonyms
- Planorbis stanleyi Smith, 1888

= Biomphalaria stanleyi =

Species of gastropod

Biomphalaria stanleyi is a species of air-breathing freshwater snail, an aquatic pulmonate gastropod mollusk in the family Planorbidae, the ram's horn snails.

== Distribution ==
This species is African, and occurs in:

- Lake Albert, Uganda. (Lake Albert is between Uganda and Democratic Republic of the Congo)
- Lake Chad
- Lake Cohoha in Burundi

== Phylogeny ==
A cladogram showing phylogenic relations of species in the genus Biomphalaria:

- Biomphalaria
  - - - - - - - - - Biomphalaria stanleyi
                  - Biomphalaria pfeifferi
                - Biomphalaria camerunensis
              - Nilotic species complex
                - - - Biomphalaria sudanica
                    - Biomphalaria choanomphala
                  - Biomphalaria alexandrina
                - Biomphalaria smithi
            - Biomphalaria glabrata
          - - - - Biomphalaria straminea complex
                  - - Biomphalaria kuhniana
                    - Biomphalaria straminea
                  - - Biomphalaria straminea
                    - Biomphalaria intermedia
                - - Biomphalaria amazonica
                  - Biomphalaria sp.
              - - Biomphalaria tenagophila
                - Biomphalaria occidentalis
            - - - Biomphalaria prona
                - Biomphalaria andecola
              - Biomphalaria sp. (? Biomphalaria havanensis)
        - - - Biomphalaria sp. (? Biomphalaria havanensis)
            - Biomphalaria temascalensis
          - Biomphalaria obstructa
      - Biomphalaria helophila
    - Biomphalaria peregrina
  - Biomphalaria schrammi

== Ecology ==
Biomphalaria stanleyi is found in deeper water in Lake Albert.

Parasites of Biomphalaria stanleyi include Schistosoma mansoni.
