= Biomphalaria glabrata =

- A biological specimen of Biomphalaria glabrata.

Scientific classification
- Kingdom: Animalia
- Phylum: Mollusca
- Class: Gastropoda
- Superorder: Hygrophila
- Family: Planorbidae
- Genus: Biomphalaria
- Species: B. glabrata

Binomial name
- Biomphalaria glabrata (Say, 1818)

Synonyms
- Planorbis glabratus Say, 1818; Australorbis glabratus (Say, 1818); Taphius glabratus (Say, 1818); Planorbis guadaloupensis Sowerby; Planorbis ferrugineus Spix, 1827; Planorbis olivaceus Spix, 1827; Planorbis nigricans Spix, 1827; Planorbis albescens Spix, 1827; Planorbis viridis Spix, 1827; Planorbis lugubris J. A. Wagner, 1827

Species of mollusc

Biomphalaria glabrata is a species of air-breathing freshwater snail, an aquatic pulmonate gastropod mollusk in the family Planorbidae, the ram's horn snails.

Biomphalaria glabrata is an intermediate snail host for the trematode Schistosoma mansoni, which is one of the main schistosomes that infect humans. This snail is a medically important pest, because of transferring the disease intestinal schistosomiasis, the most widespread of all types of schistosomiasis.

The parasite Schistosoma mansoni (which these snails and other Biomphalaria snails carry) infects about 83.31 million people worldwide.

Biomphalaria glabrata/Schistosoma mansoni provides a useful model system for investigating the intimate interactions between host and parasite. There is a great deal of information available about this snail, because it has been, and continues to be, under intensive study by many malacologists, parasitologists and other researchers, on account of its medical significance.

The shell of this species, like all planorbids, is sinistral in coiling, but it is carried upside down, and thus it appears to be dextral.

== Distribution ==
Biomphalaria glabrata is a Neotropical species. Its native distribution includes the Caribbean: Puerto Rico, Dominican Republic, Saint Lucia, Haiti (first report in 1891), Martinique, Guadeloupe, Antigua, Vieques, Saint Martin, Saint Kitts, Curaçao, Dominica (it was probably replaced by other Biomphalaria species in Dominica, or it was eradicated), Montserrat and in South America: Venezuela, Suriname, French Guiana and Brazil.

This species has recently expanded its native range, but there is reduced its abundance in the Caribbean, because of competition with non-indigenous species and environmental change.

It inhabits new localities in the time of flooding.

== Shell description ==
Like all planorbids, the shell of Biomphalaria glabrata is planispiral, in other words coiled flat like a rope, and the spire of the shell is sunken. Also, like all planorbids, this species has a sinistral shell. In other words, the coiling of the shell is left-handed. However, like all the snails in the subfamily Planobinae, this snail carries its coiled shell upside down, and thus the shell appears to be dextral in coiling. In other families of snails, the spire is situated on top of the shell. Here, what shows on top of the shell is in fact the umbilicus.

Biomphalaria glabrata was discovered and described under the name Planorbis glabratus by American naturalist Thomas Say in 1818. Say's type description reads as follows:

Shell sinistral; whorls about five, glabrous or obsoletely rugose, polished, destitute of any appearance of carina; spire perfectly regular, a little concave; umbilicus large, regularly and deeply concave, exhibiting all the volutions to the summit; aperture declining, remarkably oblique with respect to the transverse diameter. Breadth nearly nine-tenths of an inch.

Unfortunately Say listed an incorrect type locality: North Carolina. The shell was probably actually from the West Indian island of Guadeloupe.

The shell of animals from natural habitats is usually olivaceous (olive drab) in color. The width of the shell of adults snails is 6–10 mm.

An adult shell consist of aragonite and sometimes there is also under 1.5% of vaterite especially near the margin of the shell.

== Anatomy ==
The anatomy of the mantle cavity is described in Sullivan et al. (1974) and Jurberg et al. (1997).

=== Genetics ===
The genome length is estimated as about 929,10 Mb (millions of base pairs; 0.95 ± 0.01 pg), which is a small genome size among gastropods. Sequencing of the whole genome was approved as a priority by National Human Genome Research Institute in August 2004, Its participants also included the "Biomphalaria glabrata Genome Initiative" and the Genome Center at Washington University in St. Louis. The complete genome was sequenced in 2017.

The chromosomes in this snail are small, and the haploid number of chromosomes is 18.

A complete genome sequence from the mitochondria of this species has been available since 2004: the mitochondrial genome sequence has 13670 nucleotides.

The ancestor of Biomphalaria glabrata colonized Africa and speciated into all the African Biomphalaria species.

== Phylogeny ==
A cladogram showing phylogenic relations of species in the genus Biomphalaria:

- Biomphalaria
  - - - - - - African species
              - - - Biomphalaria stanleyi
                  - Biomphalaria pfeifferi
                - Biomphalaria camerunensis
              - Nilotic species complex
                - - - Biomphalaria sudanica
                    - Biomphalaria choanomphala
                  - Biomphalaria alexandrina
                - Biomphalaria smithi
            - Biomphalaria glabrata
          - - - - Biomphalaria straminea complex
                  - - Biomphalaria kuhniana
                    - Biomphalaria straminea
                  - - Biomphalaria straminea
                    - Biomphalaria intermedia
                - - Biomphalaria amazonica
                  - Biomphalaria sp.
              - - Biomphalaria tenagophila
                - Biomphalaria occidentalis
            - - - Biomphalaria prona
                - Biomphalaria andecola
              - Biomphalaria sp. (? Biomphalaria havanensis)
        - - - Biomphalaria sp. (? Biomphalaria havanensis)
            - Biomphalaria temascalensis
          - Biomphalaria obstructa
      - Biomphalaria helophila
    - Biomphalaria peregrina
  - Biomphalaria schrammi

== Ecology ==
Biomphalaria glabrata inhabits small streams, ponds and marshes. These snails can survive in aestivation for a few months when removed from their freshwater habitat or when the habitat dries out. For example, the snail lives in banana plantation drains in Saint Lucia.

Biomphalaria glabrata can also survive up to 16 hours in anaerobic water using lactic acid fermentation.

Like other species, this snail is "light sensitive" and can be disrupted by artificial light.

=== Feeding habits ===
Biomphalaria glabrata feeds on bacterial films, algae, diatoms and decaying macrophytes.

They can be fed using fish food and lettuce when they are kept in captivity.

=== Life cycle ===
Biomphalaria glabrata snails lay egg masses at rather a high rate (about 1 per day). One snail can lay 14,000 eggs during its whole life span.

The periostracum of the embryonic shell (inside the egg) begin to grow in 48-hour old embryos. Amorphous calcium carbonate appear in 54-60-hour old embryos. Calcification (formation of aragonite) of the embryonic shell starts in the time interval between 60-hour old embryos and 72-hour-old ones. The weight of the shell of 72-hour-old embryo is 0.64 μg.

The weight of the embryonic shell in 5-day-old (120-hours-old) embryos a very short time before hatching, is 30.3 μg, and the width is 500 μm. The juvenile snail hatches from 5 to 6 days old eggs. The weight of the juvenile shell is 2.04 mg in four weeks after hatching. There is no vaterite in juvenile shells.

The growth rate, maximum birth rate, and longevity of Biomphalaria glabrata was studied by Pimentel (1957). There can be up to seven generations in one year in laboratory. The generation time (the time it takes a snail from developing from an egg to laying an egg of its own) is 4–6 weeks. The lifespan is 15–18 months in natural conditions. The lifespan in laboratory conditions can be up to 18–24 months, but usually it is 9–12 months.

Biomphalaria glabrata is a simultaneous hermaphrodite, but self-fertilization is also possible. The mucus of this snail species contains species-specific signals that allow individual snails to identify others of the same species, but the causative mucus components decay within 10 to 30 min. The typically unilateral copulations are initiated when a male actor mounts the shell of a prospective mate. The male actor then moves towards the frontal left edge of the partner's shell, where he probes the female gonopore with his penis to subsequently achieve penis intromission. Following a typically 5–87 min penis intromission with usually successful sperm transfer, the male actor retracts to terminate copulation. Mating roles are subsequently exchanged in about 45% of all copulations, with the male actor now taking the female role, and vice versa. In 2009, Biomphalaria glabrata was a subject of the study focusing on the Coolidge effect in simultaneous hermaphrodites. The result of this research is that Biomphalaria glabrata shows the absence of any sex-specific effects of partner novelty, which means there is no Coolidge effect in this species.

=== Parasites ===
Biomphalaria glabrata is a major intermediate host for Schistosoma mansoni in the Americas and a vector of schistosomiasis.

In medical research, the most commonly used Biomphalaria glabrata snail stock (used for the maintenance of Schistosoma mansoni) is albino, i.e. it is without pigment. It is descended from a mutant albino stock which arose during research by Newton (1955). Not only did this albino variety prove to be highly susceptible to Schistosoma mansoni, but the lack of pigment allowed investigators using a dissecting microscope to view the development of the parasite within the snail. The black pigment normally found in snails that are taken from the field previously made this viewing too difficult.

There are both resistant and susceptible strains of B. glabrata. Li et al 2021 finds resistant snails to have innate immune receptors specifically to fight S. mansoni infection. These IIRs are expressed on particular immune cells.

Some other trematodes are also natural parasites of Biomphalaria glabrata:

- Ribeiroia marini
- Candidatus Paenibacillus glabratella – this bacterial pathogen is causing white nodules and high mortalities of snails.

Experimental parasites include:

- Angiostrongylus vasorum – (experimental)
- Echinostoma caproni – (experimental)
- Echinostoma paraensei – (experimental)
- Echinostoma trivolvis – as second (experimental) intermediate host (referred as Echinostoma revolutum in Anderson & Fried (1987)).
- Plagiorchis elegans can experimentally infect Biomphalaria glabrata and it can cause its parasitic castration, but the snail is incompatible for its full development.

==== Interaction with schistosome ====
Schistosoma mansoni can infect juveniles of Biomphalaria glabrata much more easily than it can adults. Schistosoma mansoni causes parasitic castration in infected snails.

Interactions between snails and schistosomes are complex and there exists an urgent need to elucidate pathways involved in snail-parasite relationships as well as to identify those factors involved in the intricate balance between the snail internal defence system and trematode infectivity mechanisms that determine the success or failure of an infection.

Molluscs appear to lack an adaptive immune system like that found in vertebrates and, instead, are considered to use various innate mechanisms involving cell-mediated and humoral reactions (non-cellular factors in plasma/serum or hemolymph) that interact to recognize and eliminate invading pathogens or parasites in incompatible or resistant snails. However, a diverse family of fibrinogen-related proteins (FREPs) containing immunoglobulin-like domains has been discovered in Biomphalaria glabrata and may play a role in snail defence. Circulating haemocytes (macrophage-like defence cells) in the snail haemolymph are known to aggregate in response to trauma, phagocytose small particles (bacteria, and fungi) and encapsulate larger ones, such as parasites. Final killing is effected by hemocyte-mediated cytotoxicity mechanisms involving non-oxidative and oxidative pathways, including lysosomal enzymes and reactive oxygen/nitrogen intermediates. Certain alleles of cytosolic copper/zinc superoxide dismutase (SOD1) have been associated with resistance also suggesting these processes are important in the snail internal defence system.

On the schistosome's part the Roger group (in Roger et al 2008 a & b) find that S. mansoni produces mucins. Immunoprecipitation reveals FREPs and mucins bound to each other. This suggests FREPs are detecting these mucins and recognition or failure to recognize helps to determine the course of the infection interaction.

=== Predators ===
The freshwater snail Marisa cornuarietis is a predator of Biomphalaria glabrata: it feeds on its eggs, juvenile and adult snails. It also acts as a competitor.

=== Competitors ===
Melanoides tuberculata is considered to be a competitor of Biomphalaria glabrata, but all the intraspecific interactions are not fully understood yet. Although in various countries there were contradictory results, and despite this situation being unpredictable and thus possible ecological damage might result, Melanoides tuberculata is nonetheless used in an attempt to control or reduce populations of Biomphalaria glabrata in Brazil, in the West Indies, and in Venezuela.

=== Symbionts ===
A single-celled symbiont Capsaspora owczarzaki was discovered in the haemolymph of Biomphalaria glabrata in 2002.

=== Hybrid ===
There is one known hybrid: Biomphalaria glabrata × Biomphalaria alexandrina, from Egypt.

== Toxicology ==
The absolute lethal concentration (LC_{100}) of glucose/mannose-binding lectins from plants Canavalia brasiliensis, Cratylia floribunda, Dioclea guianensis, Dioclea grandiflora and Dioclea virgata for adults of Biomphalaria glabrata is 50 μg mL^{−1}.

The latex of Euphorbia conspicua is toxic to adults of Biomphalaria glabrata.

Four species of the genus Solanum from Brazil are toxic to Biomphalaria glabrata.

Some species of Annona are toxic to adults of Biomphalaria glabrata and to its eggs.
