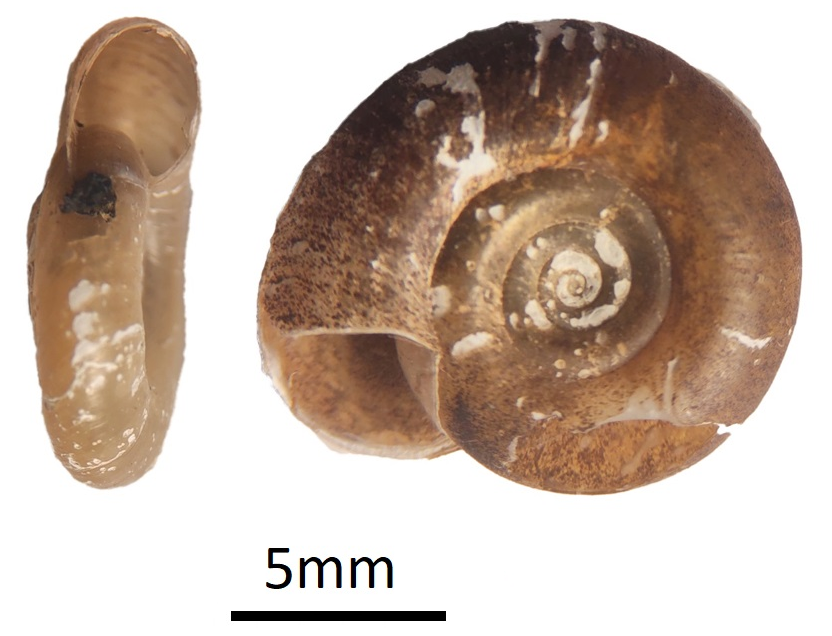
- Apical and apertural view of Biomphalaria sudanica

Scientific classification
- Kingdom: Animalia
- Phylum: Mollusca
- Class: Gastropoda
- Superorder: Hygrophila
- Family: Planorbidae
- Genus: Biomphalaria
- Species: B. sudanica

Binomial name
- Biomphalaria sudanica (Martens, 1870)

= Biomphalaria sudanica =

Species of mollusc

Biomphalaria sudanica is a species of air-breathing freshwater snail, an aquatic pulmonate gastropod belonging to the family Planorbidae, the ram's horn snails. Biomphalaria sudanica has a discoidal, brown shell with an approximate shell diameter of 9–11mm. Biomphalaria sudanica is a medically important pest, due to it being an intermediate host of the intravascular trematode genus, Schistosoma.

== Habitat and distribution ==
Biomphalaria sudanica is an African species found in freshwater habitats such as rivers, streams, ponds and the Great African Lakes. Their head has a pair of tentacles with eyes at the base, and a siphon for breathing and waste elimination. It is known to prefer slow-moving water with vegetation, where it feeds on algae and detritus.

The distribution of Biomphalaria sudanica mainly occurs in East Africa:

- The River Nile, Shambat, Sudan.
- Lake Albert, Uganda. (Lake Albert is between Uganda and Democratic Republic of the Congo)
- Lake Kyoga, Uganda.
- Lake Ziway, Ethiopia

== Ecology and behavior ==
Biomphalaria sudanica is known to be an intermediate host for the parasitic flatworms Schistosoma mansoni, which is responsible for causing intestinal schistosomiasis in humans. The snail's role as an intermediate host allows the parasite to complete its life cycle and infect humans who come into contact with contaminated water sources where it inhabits.

In addition to its role in transmitting parasites, Biomphalaria sudanica also plays an important ecological role in its freshwater habitat. The snail feeds on algae and detritus, helping to regulate the nutrient balance of the ecosystem. It also serves as a food source for many predators, including fish, birds, and other invertebrates.

Biomphalaria sudanica is found in shallow water near the shoreline in Lake Albert. Despite being a pulmonate, Biomphalaria sudanica is well adapted to use the oxygen from water (but not as well as Planorbis). This ability is useful for living in swamp habitats. The population density of Biomphalaria sudanica varies during the year. The highest population density of Biomphalaria sudanica is in Lake Ziway, Ethiopia from June to August, at the end of rainy season. It was experimentally detected under laboratory conditions that shells of Biomphalaria sudanica are bigger in waters with higher concentration of calcium than in waters with low calcium.

== Conservation status and biological importance ==
Biomphalaria sudanica is not considered a threatened species, and its population is stable in its native range. However, the species' role as an intermediate host for schistosomiasis makes it an important target for disease control programs. Constant efforts are underway to reduce the incidence of schistosomiasis by controlling the snail population through chemical treatments and biological control methods. Biomphalaria sudanica is an intermediate host for Schistosoma mansoni and for Schistosoma rodhaini.

Infestation with schistosomes in the Lake Victoria basin is about 1%, but can be up to 50% in the case of Schistosoma mansoni and up to 6% in Schistosoma rodhaini in some localities.

== Phylogeny ==
A cladogram showing the phylogenic relations of species in the genus Biomphalaria:

- Biomphalaria
  - - - - - - - - - Biomphalaria stanleyi
                  - Biomphalaria pfeifferi
                - Biomphalaria camerunensis
              - Nilotic species complex
                - - - Biomphalaria sudanica
                    - Biomphalaria choanomphala
                  - Biomphalaria alexandrina
                - Biomphalaria smithi
            - Biomphalaria glabrata
          - - - - Biomphalaria straminea complex
                  - - Biomphalaria kuhniana
                    - Biomphalaria straminea
                  - - Biomphalaria straminea
                    - Biomphalaria intermedia
                - - Biomphalaria amazonica
                  - Biomphalaria sp.
              - - Biomphalaria tenagophila
                - Biomphalaria occidentalis
            - - - Biomphalaria prona
                - Biomphalaria andecola
              - Biomphalaria sp. (? Biomphalaria havanensis)
        - - - Biomphalaria sp. (? Biomphalaria havanensis)
            - Biomphalaria temascalensis
          - Biomphalaria obstructa
      - Biomphalaria helophila
    - Biomphalaria peregrina
  - Biomphalaria schrammi

However, upon further analysis of the African Biomphalaria species found B. sudanica is a part of the "Nilotic Species Complex" and is more closely related to B. alexandrina, B. smithi and B. stanleyi, than the previously thought, B. choanomphala.

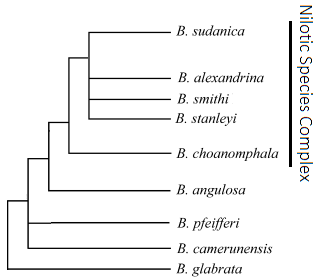
Phylogenetic Tree of the African Biomphalaria species

== Ecological phenotypes ==
Biomphalaria sudanica has been the subject of multiple ecological and genetic studies. However, unlike B. choanomphala and B. pfeifferi, there have been no reports of ecological phenotypic variation in B. sudanica snails. However, in the case of B. sudanica, it is often misidentified as the non-lacustrine ecophenotype (morphotype-A) of B. choanomphala at Lake Victoria. This is due to B. choanomphala inhabiting a large number of different ecosystems in Lake Victoria and the non-lacustrine morphotype commonly occurs in similar habitats (Common Water Hyacinth Eichhornia crassipes) of B. sudanica snails in Lake Albert, Lake Kyoga and Lake Ziway.

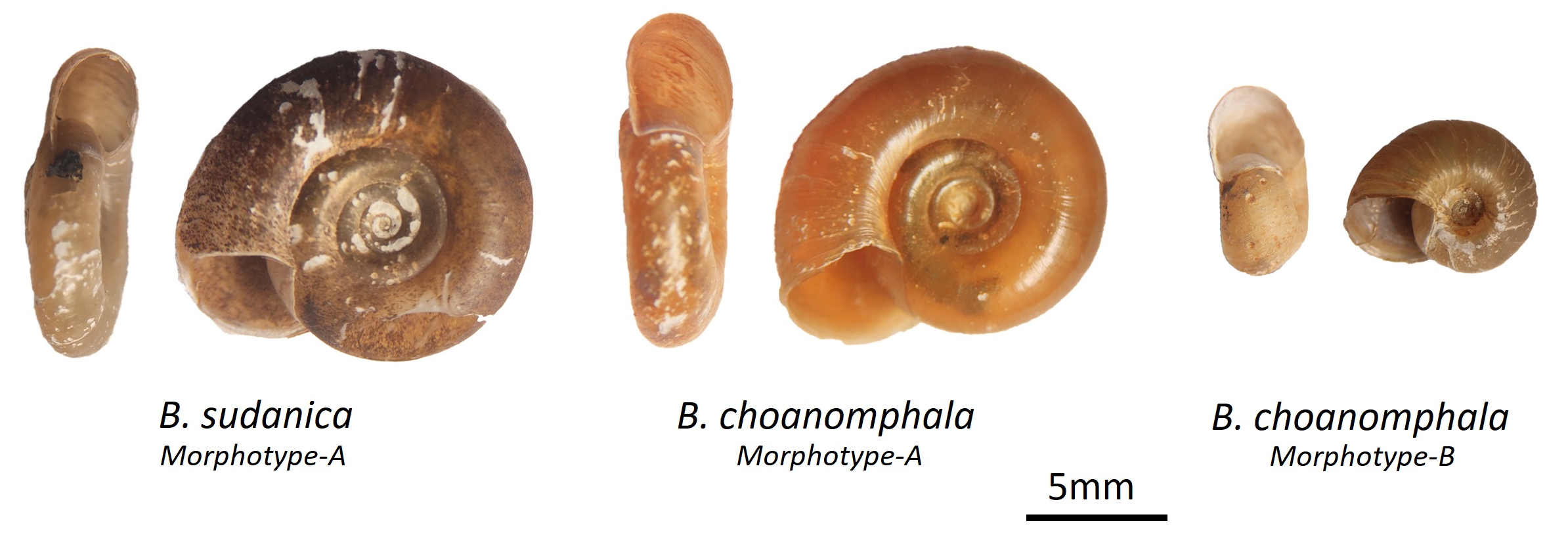
Comparing the shell morphologies of Biomphalaria sudanica and B. choanomphala.
