= Biomphalaria smithi =

Scientific classification
- Kingdom: Animalia
- Phylum: Mollusca
- Class: Gastropoda
- Superorder: Hygrophila
- Family: Planorbidae
- Genus: Biomphalaria
- Species: B. smithi

Binomial name
- Biomphalaria smithi Preston, 1910

Species of gastropod

Biomphalaria smithi is a species of air-breathing freshwater snail, an aquatic pulmonate gastropod mollusk in the family Planorbidae, the ram's horn snails.

Biomphalaria smithi is the type species of the genus Biomphalaria. The type material is stored in the Natural History Museum.

== Distribution ==
The type locality is the Lake Albert, Uganda.

== Shell description ==
The width of the shell is from 7.5 mm to 9.5. The height of the shell is 4 mm. The height of the aperture is 5 mm. The width of the aperture is 4.5 mm.

== Phylogeny ==
A cladogram showing phylogenic relations of species in the genus Biomphalaria:

- Biomphalaria
  - - - - - - - - - Biomphalaria stanleyi
                  - Biomphalaria pfeifferi
                - Biomphalaria camerunensis
              - Nilotic species complex
                - - - Biomphalaria sudanica
                    - Biomphalaria choanomphala
                  - Biomphalaria alexandrina
                - Biomphalaria smithi
            - Biomphalaria glabrata
          - - - - Biomphalaria straminea complex
                  - - Biomphalaria kuhniana
                    - Biomphalaria straminea
                  - - Biomphalaria straminea
                    - Biomphalaria intermedia
                - - Biomphalaria amazonica
                  - Biomphalaria sp.
              - - Biomphalaria tenagophila
                - Biomphalaria occidentalis
            - - - Biomphalaria prona
                - Biomphalaria andecola
              - Biomphalaria sp. (? Biomphalaria havanensis)
        - - - Biomphalaria sp. (? Biomphalaria havanensis)
            - Biomphalaria temascalensis
          - Biomphalaria obstructa
      - Biomphalaria helophila
    - Biomphalaria peregrina
  - Biomphalaria schrammi
