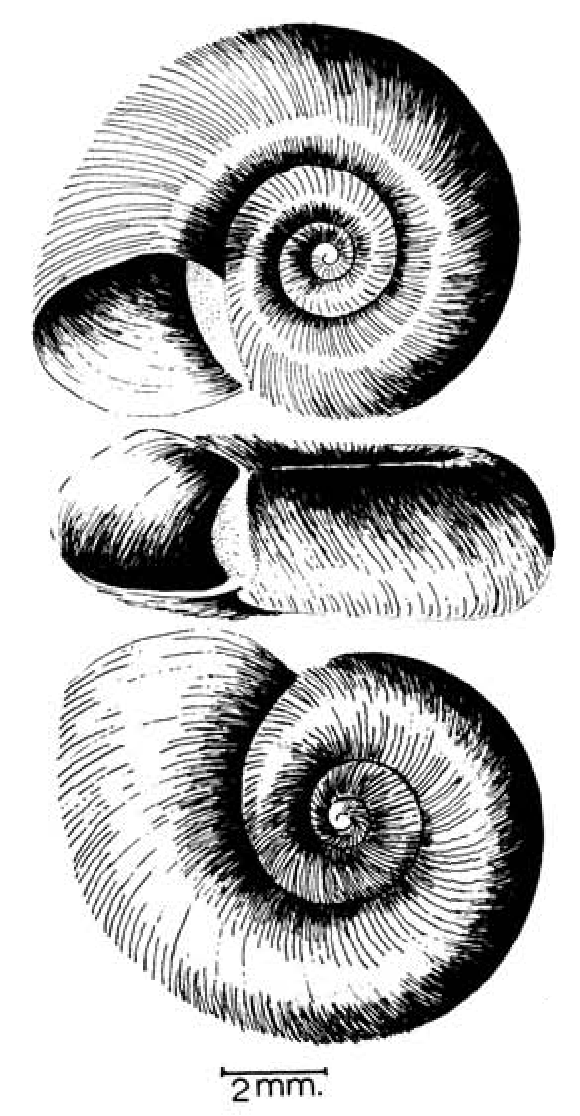
- Drawing of apical, apertural and umbilical view of the shell of Biomphalaria pfeifferi.

Scientific classification
- Kingdom: Animalia
- Phylum: Mollusca
- Class: Gastropoda
- Superorder: Hygrophila
- Family: Planorbidae
- Genus: Biomphalaria
- Species: B. pfeifferi

Binomial name
- Biomphalaria pfeifferi (Krauss, 1848)

= Biomphalaria pfeifferi =

Species of gastropod

Biomphalaria pfeifferi is a species of air-breathing freshwater snail, an aquatic animal pulmonate gastropod mollusk in the family Planorbidae, the ram's horn snails.

This snail is a medically important pest, because of transferring the disease schistosomiasis.

== Distribution ==
Biomphalaria pfeifferi is an African species. It has recently expanded its native range to the Arabian Peninsula and Madagascar.

Distribution of Biomphalaria pfeifferi include:

- Western Africa: Senegal
- Eastern Africa: Kenya
- Southern Africa: Botswana and South Africa.

The type locality is in Umgeni Valley, KwaZulu-Natal, South Africa (in the times of the description it was the British Colony of Natal).

== Phylogeny ==
A cladogram showing phylogenic relations of species in the genus Biomphalaria:

- Biomphalaria
  - - - - - - - - - Biomphalaria stanleyi
                  - Biomphalaria pfeifferi
                - Biomphalaria camerunensis
              - Nilotic species complex
                - - - Biomphalaria sudanica
                    - Biomphalaria choanomphala
                  - Biomphalaria alexandrina
                - Biomphalaria smithi
            - Biomphalaria glabrata
          - - - - Biomphalaria straminea complex
                  - - Biomphalaria kuhniana
                    - Biomphalaria straminea
                  - - Biomphalaria straminea
                    - Biomphalaria intermedia
                - - Biomphalaria amazonica
                  - Biomphalaria sp.
              - - Biomphalaria tenagophila
                - Biomphalaria occidentalis
            - - - Biomphalaria prona
                - Biomphalaria andecola
              - Biomphalaria sp. (? Biomphalaria havanensis)
        - - - Biomphalaria sp. (? Biomphalaria havanensis)
            - Biomphalaria temascalensis
          - Biomphalaria obstructa
      - Biomphalaria helophila
    - Biomphalaria peregrina
  - Biomphalaria schrammi

== Mating system ==
B. pfeifferi is hermaphroditic, and genetic analyses performed both at the family and population levels indicate high self-fertilization rates. However, B. pfeifferi exhibits only a low level of inbreeding depression.

== Ecology ==
Biomphalaria pfeifferi can survive up to 16 hours in anaerobic water using lactic acid fermentation.

In Kenya, B. pfeifferi is positively associated with the common blue water-lily Nymphaea caerulea (the two species occur together).

=== Parasites ===
Parasites of Biomphalaria pfeifferi include the following 11 species found in Tanzania:

- Schistosoma mansoni
- undescribed clinostomatid
- two species undescribed strigea
- Cercaria porteri
- Cercaria blukwa
- two species of undescribed echinostome
- Cercaria lileta
- Cercaria obscurior
- Cercaria bulla

== Control ==
In Kenya, releasing the edible American crayfish Procambarus clarkii as an introduced species has helped eliminate the mollusc, which it feeds on, as well as provided a new source of food and income, but may also be impacting the environment by reducing the amount of native aquatic plants.

The seeds of the tree Balanites aegyptiaca have a molluscicide effect on Biomphalaria pfeifferi.

| Substance | Route | LC_{50} | Reference |
|---|---|---|---|
| Powder of crude kernels of Balanites aegyptiaca | immersion(?) | 60 ppm | |
| Acetone extract of powder of the kernels of Balanites aegyptiaca | immersion(?) | 172,40 ppm | |
| Ethanol extract of the powder of kernels of Balanites aegyptiaca | immersion(?) | 84,15 ppm | |

Ethanolic extract of the fruits of Dalbergia sissoo (family Leguminosae) exhibited molluscicidal effect against eggs of Biomphalaria pfeifferi.
