= Glucosamine kinase =

Identifiers
- EC no.: 2.7.1.8
- CAS no.: 9031-90-7

Databases
- IntEnz: IntEnz view
- BRENDA: BRENDA entry
- ExPASy: NiceZyme view
- KEGG: KEGG entry
- MetaCyc: metabolic pathway
- PRIAM: profile
- PDB structures: RCSB PDB PDBe PDBsum
- Gene Ontology: AmiGO / QuickGO
Search
- PMC: articles
- PubMed: articles
- NCBI: proteins

Glucosamine kinase (EC 2.7.1.8) is an enzyme that catalyzes the chemical reaction

ATP +
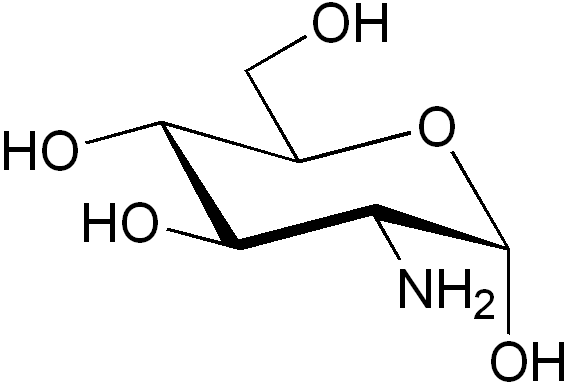
glucosamine
ADP +
D-glucosamine 6-phosphate

The enzyme characterised from Schistosoma mansoni converts the hexose sugar, D-glucosamine (shown in its cyclic form) to D-glucosamine 6-phosphate by transferring a phosphate group from the cofactor, adenosine triphosphate (ATP), which is converted to adenosine diphosphate (ADP). Two non-identical enzymes which catalyse the same reaction are known. One from Vibrio cholerae is involved in chitin breakdown. The other, from Actinobacteria is part of biosynthetic pathways to compounds with applications as antibiotics.

This enzyme is a transferase, specifically one transferring phosphorus-containing groups (phosphotransferases) with an alcohol group as acceptor. The systematic name of this enzyme class is ATP:D-glucosamine phosphotransferase. Other names in common use include glucosamine kinase (phosphorylating), ATP:2-amino-2-deoxy-D-glucose-6-phosphotransferase, and aminodeoxyglucose kinase.
