= FMRFamide in Biomphalaria glabrata =

FMRFamide, a neuropeptide involved in cardiac activity regulation, is found in Biomphalaria glabrata, a species of a freshwater snail best known for its role as the intermediate host for the human-infecting trematode parasite Schistosoma mansoni.

This freshwater snail species is used as a model organism, in other words, a non-human species which is extensively studied to understand a biological phenomenon, with the expectation that discoveries made in the model will provide insight into the workings of other organisms. Model organisms are in vivo models and are widely used to research human disease when human experimentation would be unfeasible or unethical.

== Relevance ==
This snail has been studied in relation to human pathology and the epidemiology of schistosomiasis. S. masoni is known to change its host's (B. glabrata's) behavior via the upregulation/downregulation of neuropeptides such as schistosomin and NPY, and some studies have reported that FMRFamide is aminergic, and may be implicated in the secretion of molecules to respond to infection with parasites.

The ganglionic central nervous system (CNS) of B. glabrata consists of paired cerebral, pedal, pleural, parietal, and buccal ganglia, and one unpaired visceral ganglion. FMRFamide is concentrated in the concentrated in the cerebral and visceral ganglia, although evidence from current research suggests that FMRFamide moves downward of the head-foot region of the snail as embryonic development proceeds.

The exact role of FMRFamide during early development of the embryonic central nervous system is not well studied. Detection of this neuropeptide is important because its expression lays down the foundation of the CNS in the early stages of development in invertebrates. In recent years, neuromodulatory actions of FMRFamide in invertebrates have become more apparent. This is in part due to the extensive studies done on the Planorbidae and Lymnaeidae families of pond snails.

FMRFamide expression in B. glabrata can be detected as early 72 hours, post-cleavage. Studies have shown its expression pattern in the posterior of the ganglionic nervous system, as the first FMRFamide immunoreactive cell appears at 25-28% of development and is located at the extreme posterior of the embryo. The cell sends a single process on each side and each process follows the body curvature.

As these processes elongate, two lateral FMRFamide-expressing cells are apparent on either side of the body wall. Some studies have suggested that FMRFamide these structures may innervate muscles that originate in trochophore larvae and expand during development. This neuromodulator helps to regulate cardiac activity. Several FMRFamid related peptides are known, regulating various cellular functions and possessing pharmacological actions, such as anti-opiate effects. FMRFamide may also play a role in osmoregulation and developmental patterning. This neuropeptide has multiple functions and controls many processes that allow the embryo to mature into an adult snail.

== Immunocytochemistry of FMRFamide in B. glabrata embryos ==
FMRFamide patterning over the course of embryonic life has been recorded through immunofluorescence. Embryos at 0 to 144 hours (6 days) post cleavage were extracted from the egg mass and fixed in 4% PFA for 2 hrs at room temperature. Embryos older than 4 days were pre-treated with 0.5% ethylenediaminetetraacetic acid (EDTA) solution in PBS for 5 minutes to improve primary antibody penetration, and then fixed in 4% PFA for 2 hours at room temperature. Embryos were then washed overnight in 4% Triton X-100 in PBS and incubated in blocking solution, 1% normal goal serum in PBS, overnight at 4 °C.

After blocking overnight, embryos were treated with a primary antibody solution at 1:2000 (in NGS/PBS). Secondary antibody tagged with fluorescein isothiocyanate (FITC)-conjugated anti-rabbit IgG (polyclonal) was incubated at 1:20, overnight at 4 °C. Embryos were then mounted on a slide and viewed with fluorescent microscopy.
