= Louis Westenra Sambon =

Italian-English physician

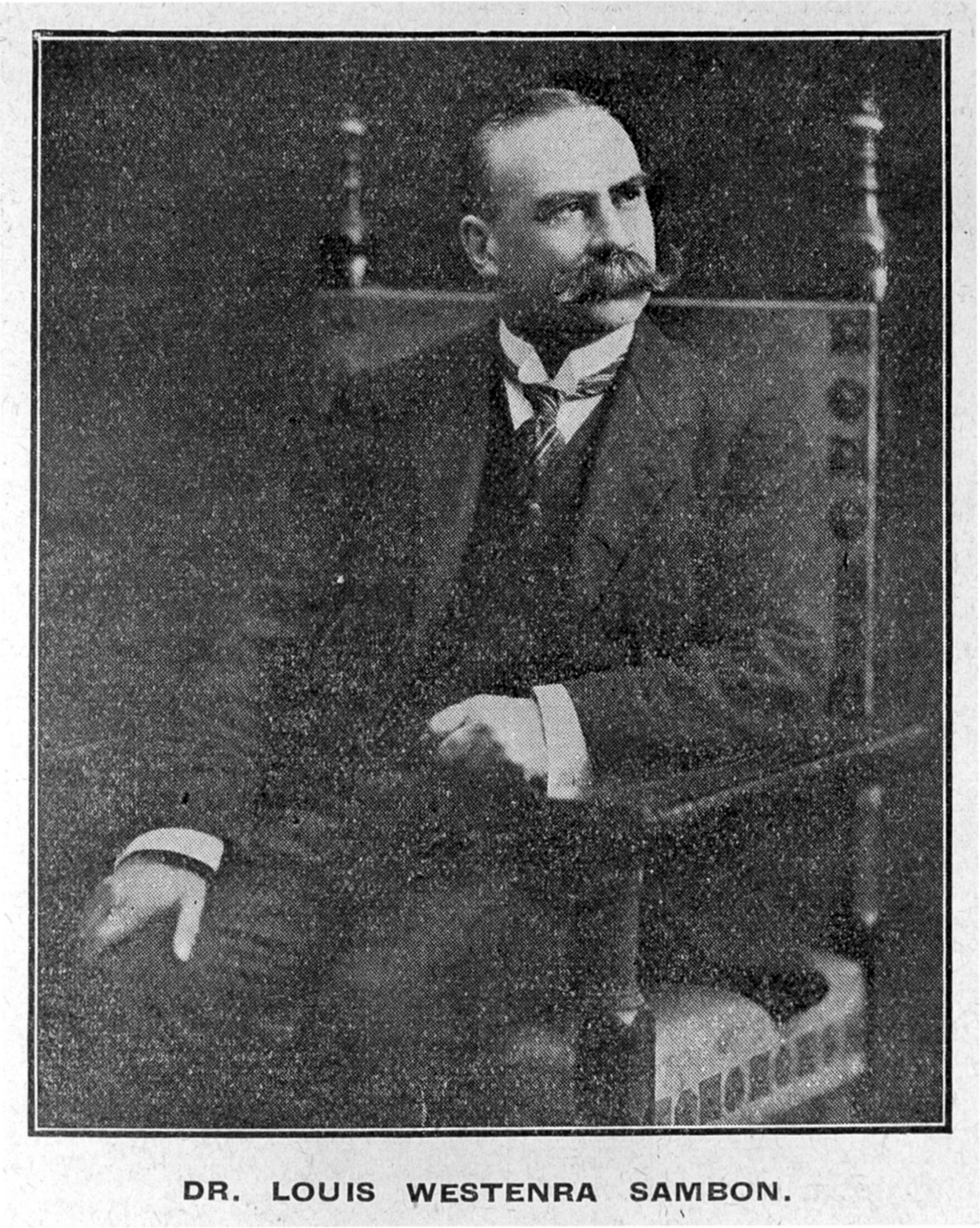
- Born: Luigi Westenra Sambon; 7 November 1867; Milan, Italy
- Died: 30 August 1931 (aged 63); Paris, France
- Education: University of Naples Federico II
- Known for: Schistosoma mansoni Etiology of trypanosomiasis, cancer and pellagra
- Scientific career
- Fields: Medicine, parasitology
- Workplaces: Liverpool School of Tropical Medicine
- Author abbrev. (zoology): Sambon

Louis Westenra Sambon (original first name Luigi, 7 November 1867 – 30 August 1931) was an Italian-English physician who played important roles in understanding the causes (etiology) of diseases. He described many pathogenic protozoans, insects, and helminths including the name Schistosoma mansoni for a blood fluke. He was an authority on the classification of parasitic tongue worms called Pentastomida (Linguatulida), and one of the genus Sambonia is named after him.

Sambon was born in Milan, Italy, and obtained an M.D. from the University of Naples Federico II. He moved to England to work at the Liverpool School of Tropical Medicine. He originated theories on the nature of diseases such as sleeping sickness, malaria, pellagra, and cancer.

== Biography ==
Sambon was born in Milan to an Italian father and an English mother. His father was an Italian soldier Commendatore (Commander) Jules Sambon, and her mother, Laura Elizabeth Day, was a distant relative of Charles Dickens. He got his name from his grandfather Louis Sambon, a French diplomat who settled in Naples. He had a younger brother Arthur (Arturo) Sambon. He attended Hoddesdon (Hertfordshire) Grammar School, studied at the College Gaillard in Lausanne, and the Liceo Umberto in Naples. In 1884 he entered the University of Naples, from where he earned his M.D. in 1891. He took part in the investigation of cholera outbreak around Naples between 1884 and 1887. For his contribution he was awarded a bronze medal, "The Public Health Award of Merit" by the Italian government.

In 1888, he enrolled in St Bartholomew's Hospital in London. But a year later, he returned to Naples. Soon after he started his professional career as a gynaecologist in Rome, his father insisted that he moved to England. In London, he immediately made acquaintance with Patrick Manson (noted as the father of tropical medicine), with whom he made lasting friendship. He spent most of his career as lecturer of tropical medicine at the Liverpool School of Tropical Medicine.

He was elected member of Société de Médecine Tropicale of Paris, a Fellow of the Royal Society of Tropical Medicine and Hygiene, and an honorary Fellow of the Manila Medical Society. In 1908, he was vice president of the Section of Tropical Disease of the British Medical Association.

He died in Paris on 30 August 1931.

== Contributions ==
=== Acclimatisation ===
In one of his first technical speeches at the Royal Geographical Society in London in 1898 (subsequently published in The Geographical Journal) regarding acclimatisation of Europeans in tropical regions, he theorised that it was a parasite not the heat that killed Europeans. It caused a serious scientific debate, because at the time, the role of diseases (especially parasites) were not known. Sambon's theory was proved right in the 1890s when it was confirmed that yellow fever was caused by a virus and transmitted by mosquito. One of the co-discoverers and who helped eradicate yellow fever in Havana, William Gorgas told Sambon, saying, "My colleagues and I are pleased to have been able to prove that you were right."

=== Sleeping sickness ===
In 1902, Manson requested Sambon to investigate sleeping sickness in Uganda. They sent an Italian microbiologist Aldo Castellani under the Royal Society Commission. Castellani discovered that patients with sleeping sickness had a protozoan parasite (Trypanosoma) in their cerebro-spinal fluid, and sometimes together with bacterial (Streptococcus) infection. Castellani published his findings in 1903. Immediately, Sambon correctly interpreted that the Trypanosoma was the causative parasite and that it was transmitted by tsetse fly.

=== Pellagra ===
Pellagra was epidemic in Italy since the late 18th century throughout the 19th century, and was spreading to America. By the late 19th century it was generally believed that it was due to maize consumption. An Italian scientist Cesare Lombroso postulated that the disease was due to the toxin in the maize. Sambon introduced the parasitic theory at the meeting of the British Medical Association in 1905, in which he stated that pellagra was an infectious disease something like kala-azar (caused by a protozoan Leishmania) in India. He was assigned to investigate pellagra in Italy for three months in 1910. His report was published in The Journal of the London School of Tropical Medicine in 1910. Sambon concluded that pellagra was caused probably by a protozoan parasite (such as a trypanosome) and was transmitted by a specific insect (such as Simulium, which includes buffalo gnats, sand flies, and black flies). According to Sambon, pellagra is:

1. not caused by maize because it is present in countries where maize is absent;
2. a parasitic disease because it has the characteristic symptoms of parasitic infections; and
3. an insect-borne disease because it is most abundant in rural areas where insects (particularly Simulium reptans) are prevalent.

Sambon's theory caused impediment to the treatment of pellagra when there was an epidemic in the early 1900s in America, because his theory was largely taken as an authority. It was only in 1915, when Joseph Goldberger, assigned to study pellagra by the Surgeon General of the United States, showed it was linked to diet that the true nature of pellagra emerged. By 1916, he convinced the medical community that pellagra was not infectious. In 1937, Conrad Elvehjem established that pellagra is due to deficiency of the vitamin niacin.

=== Cancer ===
Sambon proposed the parasitic theory of cancer. According to him, cancer is a kind of parasite that lives inside the body and progressively invade other tissues. His theory was supported by the discovery of a cancer-causing roundworm (Gongylonema neoplasticum) by a Danish physician Johannes Fibiger in 1907. [Fibiger was given the 1926 Nobel Prize in Physiology or Medicine, but his discovery was later proved wrong.] Sambon further introduced terms such as "cancer houses" and "cancer streets" to describe specific locations where cancers originate and are more prevalent.
