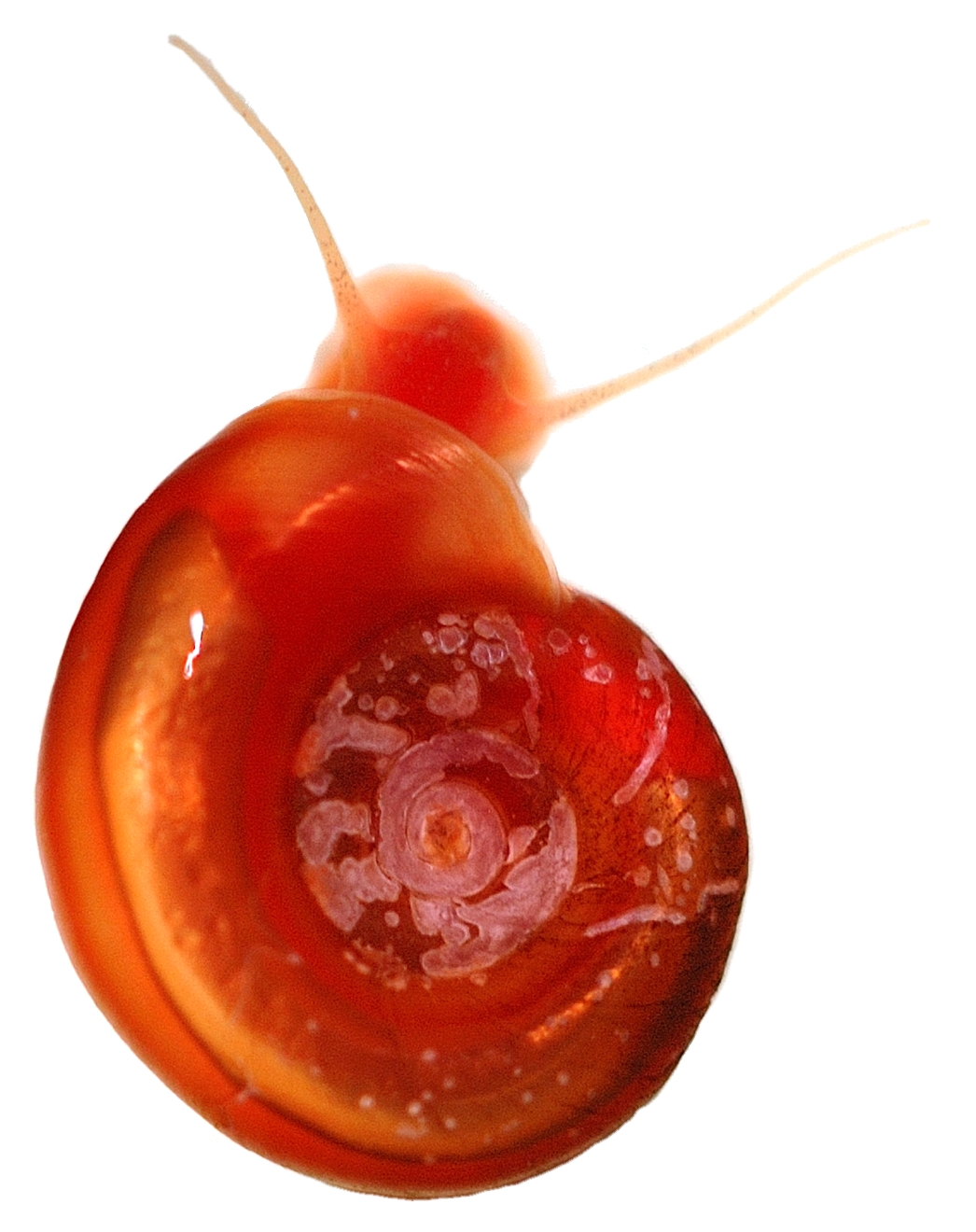
- An albino individual of Biomphalaria glabrata

Scientific classification
- Kingdom: Animalia
- Phylum: Mollusca
- Class: Gastropoda
- Superorder: Hygrophila
- Family: Planorbidae
- Subfamily: Planorbinae
- Tribe: Helisomatini
- Genus: Biomphalaria; Preston, 1910

Type species
- Biomphalaria smithi Preston, 1910

Diversity
- 34 species

Synonyms
- Taphius (H. Adams & A. Adams, 1855) Planorbis (Planorbina) (Haldeman, 1842)

= Biomphalaria =

Biomphalaria Temporal range: Eocene–Recent

Genus of freshwater snails

Biomphalaria is a genus of air-breathing freshwater snails, aquatic pulmonates belonging to the family Planorbidae, the ram's horn snails and their allies.

Biomphalaria is the type genus of the tribe Biomphalariini. Both Planorbis and Taphius are synonyms for Biomphalaria.

The shell of this species, like all planorbids is left coiling (sinistral), but is carried upside down and thus appears to be right coiling (dextral).

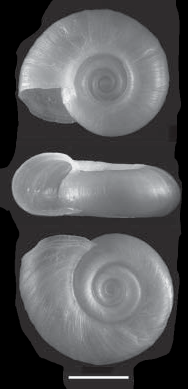
Apical, apertural and umbilical view of the shell of Biomphalaria tenagophila. Scale bar is 3 mm.

== Species ==
There are a suspected 35 extant species in the genus Biomphalaria in total (21 American species and 14 Old World species). However, there are a large number of invalid taxa within the Biomphalaria literature, which is likely the result of several (if not all) species of Biomphalaria being subject to various sources of intraspecific variation such as ecophenotypic variation and indeterminate shell growth. This intraspecific variation can make two individuals of the same species appear as two taxonomically distinct entities when identified using only morphological identification methods.

New World (South American) species include:

1. Biomphalaria amazonica (Paraense, 1966)
2. Biomphalaria andecola (d'Orbigny, 1835)
3. Biomphalaria cousini (Paraense, 1966)
4. Biomphalaria edisoni (Estrada, Velásquez, Caldeira, Bejarano, Rojas & Carvalho, 2006)
5. Biomphalaria glabrata (Say, 1818)
6. Biomphalaria havanensis (L. Pfeiffer, 1839)
7. Biomphalaria helophila (d'Orbigny, 1835)
8. Biomphalaria intermedia (Paraense & Deslandes, 1962)
9. Biomphalaria kuhniana (Clessin, 1883)
10. † Biomphalaria manya (Cabrera & Martinez, 2018)
11. Biomphalaria obstructa (Morelet, 1849)
12. Biomphalaria occidentalis (Paraense, 1981)
13. Biomphalaria oligoza (Paraense, 1974)
14. Biomphalaria orbignyi (Paraense, 1975)
15. Biomphalaria peregrina (d'Orbigny, 1835)
16. Biomphalaria prona (E. von Martens, 1873)
17. † Biomphalaria reversa
18. Biomphalaria schrammi (Crosse, 1864)
19. Biomphalaria straminea (Dunker, 1848)
20. Biomphalaria subprona (Martens, 1899)
21. Biomphalaria temascalensis (Rangel-Ruiz, 1987)
22. Biomphalaria tenagophila (d'Orbigny, 1835)

Old World (Africa, Madagascar and the Middle East) species include:

Confirmed species using molecular identification methods:

1. Biomphalaria alexandrina (Ehrenberg, 1831)
2. Biomphalaria angulosa (Mandahl-Barth, 1957)
3. Biomphalaria camerunensis (Mandahl-Barth, 1957)
4. Biomphalaria choanomphala (E. von Martens, 1879)
5. Biomphalaria pfeifferi (Krauss, 1848)
6. Biomphalaria smithi (Preston, 1910) - type species
7. Biomphalaria stanleyi (Smith, 1888)
8. Biomphalaria sudanica (Martens, 1870)

There is one known hybrid Biomphalaria glabrata × Biomphalaria alexandrina from Egypt.

Suspected species identified using morphological methods:

1. Biomphalaria arabica (Melvill & Ponsonby, 1896)
2. Biomphalaria barthi (Brown, 1973)
3. Biomphalaria rhodesiensis (Mandahl-Barth, 1957)
4. Biomphalaria ruppellii (Dunker, 1848) - subspecies: B. ruppellii ruppellii; B. ruppellii katangae Haas
5. Biomphalaria salinarum (Morelet, 1868)
6. Biomphalaria tchadiensis (Germain, 1904)

== Phylogeny ==
A cladogram created from mitochondrial and nuclear DNA showing the phylogenic relationships of both New World (16) and Old World (7) species:

- Biomphalaria
  - - - - - - African species
              - - - Biomphalaria stanleyi
                  - Biomphalaria pfeifferi
                - Biomphalaria camerunensis
              - Nilotic species complex
                - - - Biomphalaria sudanica
                    - Biomphalaria choanomphala
                  - Biomphalaria alexandrina
                - Biomphalaria smithi
            - Biomphalaria glabrata
          - - - - Biomphalaria straminea complex
                  - - Biomphalaria kuhniana
                    - Biomphalaria straminea
                  - - Biomphalaria straminea
                    - Biomphalaria intermedia
                - - Biomphalaria amazonica
                  - Biomphalaria sp.
              - - Biomphalaria tenagophila
                - Biomphalaria occidentalis
            - - - Biomphalaria prona
                - Biomphalaria andecola
              - Biomphalaria sp. (? Biomphalaria havanensis)
        - - - Biomphalaria sp. (? Biomphalaria havanensis)
            - Biomphalaria temascalensis
          - Biomphalaria obstructa
      - Biomphalaria helophila
    - Biomphalaria peregrina
  - Biomphalaria schrammi

The topology was consistent with the proposed Neotropical origins of the genus, with the oldest Biomphalaria fossils being dated from approximately 60 million years ago. However, further analysis of the African Biomphalaria species found only B. camerunensis and B. pfeifferi were the only definitive African species, with the remain species being a part of (or a sister taxa to) the "Nilotic species complex":

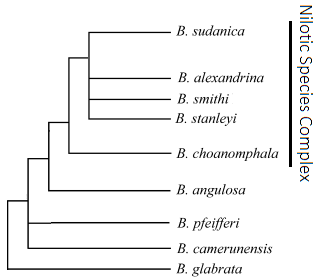
African Biomphalaria phylogenetic tree.png

All of the African Biomphalaria species have low levels of genetic diversity, which is likely the result of their relatively recent evolutionary history.

== Distribution ==
The origin of the genus Biomphalaria is American. The ancestor of Biomphalaria glabrata colonized Africa 2.3–4.5 or 2–5 million years ago and speciated into all the African Biomphalaria species.

Natural populations of these snails are usually found in tropical standing water or freshwater in South America and Africa, but they also reach 30° latitude in subtropical areas. Many species of these red-blooded planorbid snails (Gastropoda: Basommatophora) are able to survive a long time when removed from their freshwater habitat. Of the 34 Biomphalaria species, four (Biomphalaria glabrata, Biomphalaria pfeifferi, Biomphalaria straminea, and Biomphalaria tenagophila) have recently expanded their native ranges. They have been introduced to areas where other Biomphalaria species are endemic (e.g., Congo and Egypt) or to subtropical zones that have no frost period (Texas, Louisiana, Florida, Hong Kong).

No species in the genus Biomphalaria has become established in the United States, the genus being represented there only by native Biomphalaria obstructa, but they are considered to represent a potentially serious threat as a pest, an invasive species which could negatively affect agriculture, natural ecosystems, human health or commerce. Therefore, it has been suggested that this species be given top national quarantine significance in the USA.

== Parasites ==
This genus of snails is medically important, because the snails can carry a parasite of humans which represents a serious disease risk: the snails serve as an intermediate host (vector) for the human parasitic blood fluke, Schistosoma mansoni, that infects about 83 million people.

The human disease schistosomiasis (aka snail fever) caused by all Schistosoma species (transmitted also by other snails) infects 200 million people. The fluke, which is found primarily in tropical areas, infects mammals (including humans) via contact with water that contains schistosome larvae (cercariae) which have previously been released from the snail. Infection occurs via penetration of cercariae through the skin.

Eighteen species of Biomphalaria are intermediate hosts for Schistosoma mansoni; seven species of the genus have not been tested for this susceptibility and nine species are resistant. Altogether about 30 species of parasites from Africa and at least 20 species from the Neotropics are known to parasitize Biomphalaria.
