= Biomphalaria angulosa =

Conservation status
- Least Concern (IUCN 3.1)

Scientific classification
- Kingdom: Animalia
- Phylum: Mollusca
- Class: Gastropoda
- Superorder: Hygrophila
- Family: Planorbidae
- Genus: Biomphalaria
- Species: B. angulosa

Binomial name
- Biomphalaria angulosa Mandahl-Barth, 1957

Species of gastropod

Biomphalaria angulosa is a species of air-breathing freshwater snail, an aquatic pulmonate gastropod mollusk in the family Planorbidae, the ram's horn snails.

This species is found in Malawi, Tanzania, and Zambia.
