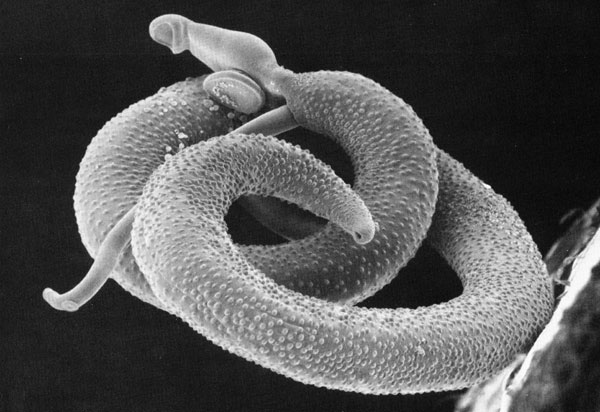
- Schistosomes copulating

Scientific classification
- Kingdom: Animalia
- Phylum: Platyhelminthes
- Class: Trematoda
- Order: Diplostomida
- Family: Schistosomatidae
- Genus: Schistosoma
- Species: S. mansoni

Binomial name
- Schistosoma mansoni Sambon, 1907

= Schistosoma mansoni =

Species of fluke

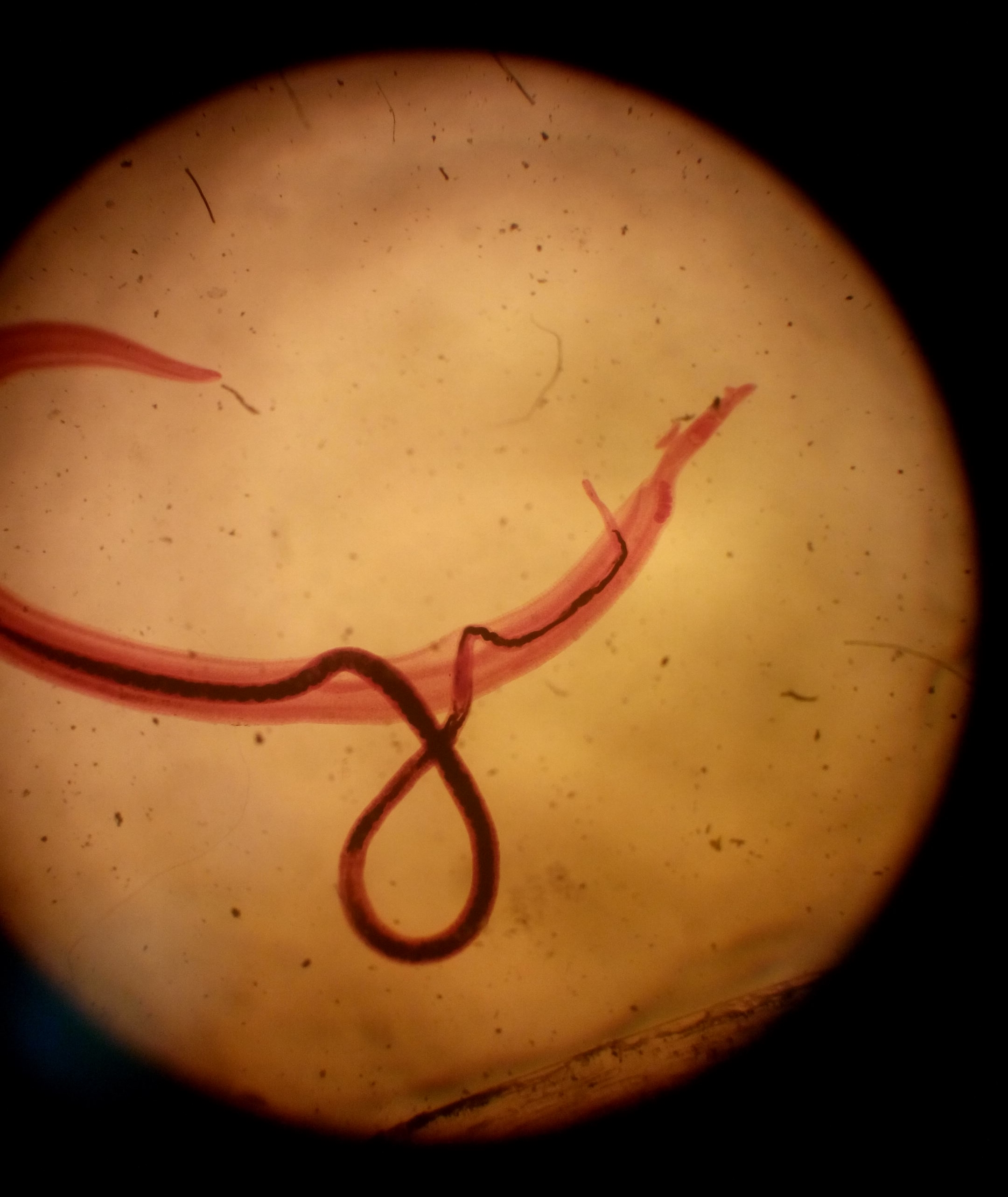
A paired couple of Schistosoma mansoni.

Schistosoma mansoni is a water-borne parasite of humans, and belongs to the group of blood flukes (Schistosoma). The adult lives in the blood vessels (mesenteric veins) near the human intestine. It causes intestinal schistosomiasis (similar to S. japonicum, S. mekongi, S. guineensis, and S. intercalatum). Clinical symptoms are caused by the eggs. As the leading cause of schistosomiasis in the world, it is the most prevalent parasite in humans. It is classified as a neglected tropical disease. As of 2021, the World Health Organization reports that 251.4 million people have schistosomiasis and most of it is due to S. mansoni. It is found in Africa, the Middle East, the Caribbean, Brazil, Venezuela and Suriname.

Unlike other flukes (trematodes) in which sexes are not separate (monoecious), schistosomes are unique in that adults are divided into males and females, thus, gonochoric. However, a permanent male-female pair, a condition called in copula, is required to become adults; for this, they are considered as hermaphrodites.

The life cycle of schistosomes includes two hosts: humans as definitive hosts, where the parasite undergoes sexual reproduction, and snails as intermediate hosts, where a series of asexual reproduction takes place. S. mansoni is transmitted through water, where freshwater snails of the genus Biomphalaria act as intermediate hosts. The larvae are able to live in water and infect the hosts by directly penetrating the skin. Prevention of infection is done by improved sanitation and killing the snails. Infection is treated with praziquantel or oxamniquine.

S. mansoni was first noted by Theodor Maximillian Bilharz in Egypt in 1851, while discovering S. haematobium. Sir Patrick Manson identified it as unique species in 1902. Louis Westenra Sambon gave the name Schistosomum mansoni in 1907 in honour of Manson.

== Structure ==
=== Adult ===
Schistosomes, unlike other trematodes, are long and cylindrical worms and are sexually dimorphic. The male S. mansoni is approximately 1 cm long (0.6–1.1 cm) and is 0.1 cm wide. It is white, and it has a funnel-shaped oral sucker at its anterior end followed by a second pediculated ventral sucker. The external part of the worm is composed of a double bilayer, which is continuously renewed as the outer layer, known as the membranocalyx, and is shed continuously. The tegument bears a large number of small tubercules. The suckers have small thorns in their inner part as well as in the buttons around them. The male genital apparatus is composed of six to nine testicular masses, situated dorsally. There is one deferent canal beginning at each testicle, which is connected to a single deferent that dilates into a reservatory, the seminal vesicle, located at the beginning of the gynaecophoric canal. The copula happens through the coaptation of the male and female genital orifices.

The female has a cylindrical body, longer and thinner than the male's (1.2 to 1.6 cm long by 0.016 cm wide). It has the general appearance of a roundworm. The female parasite is darker, and it looks gray. The darker color is due to the presence of a pigment (hemozoin) in its digestive tube. This pigment is derived from the digestion of blood. The ovary is elongated and slightly lobulated and is located on the anterior half of the body. A short oviduct conducts to the ootype, which continues with the uterine tube. In this tube it is possible to find one to two eggs (rarely three to four) but only one egg is observed in the ootype at any one time. The genital pore opens ventrally. The posterior two-thirds of the body contains the vitelline glands and their winding canal, which unites with the oviduct a little before it reaches the ootype.

The digestive tube begins at the anterior extremity of the worm, at the bottom of the oral sucker. The digestive tube is composed of an esophagus, which divides in two branches (right and left) and that reunite in a single cecum. The intestines end blindly, meaning that there is no anus.

==== Sex ====
S. mansoni and other schistosomes are the only flukes or flatworms that exhibit sex separation as they exist as male and female individuals as in gonochoric animals. However, they are not truly dioecious since the adults live in permanent male-female pairs, a condition called in copula. Although they can be physically separated, isolated females cannot grow into sexually-mature adults. In copula starts in the liver only after which they can move to their final habitation, the inferior mesenteric veins. Individual females cannot enter the mesenteric veins. Sex organs, the gonads, are also incompletely separated and are interdependent between sexes. An egg-making organ, the vitelline gland, does not develop in females in the absence of a male. Male gametes, spermatozoa, are present in the oviduct. In males, there are rudimentary ovaries, oviduct, and oocytes (developing female gametes), as well as vitelline cells. Males also possess the genes for hermaphroditism in flukes. Thus, they are technically hermaphrodites.

=== Eggs ===
The eggs are oval-shaped, measuring 115–175 μm long and 45–47 μm wide, and ~150 μm diameter on average. They have pointed spines towards the broader base on one side, i.e. lateral spines. This is an important diagnostic tool because co-infection with S. haematobium (having terminal-spined eggs) is common, and they are hard to distinguish. When the eggs are released into the water, a lot of them are immature and unfertilised so that they do not hatch. When the eggs are larger than 160 μm in diameter, they also fail to hatch.

=== Larva ===
The miracidium (from the Greek word μειράκιον, meirakion, meaning youth) is pear-shaped, and gradually elongates as it ages. It measures about 136 μm long and 55 μm wide. The body is covered by anucleate epidermal plates separated by epidermal ridges. The epidermal cells give off numerous hair-like cilia on the body surface. There are 17–22 epidermal cells. Epidermal plate is absent only at the extreme anterior called apical papilla, or terebratorium, which contains numerous sensory organelles. Its internal body is almost fully filled with glycogen particles and vesicles.

The cercaria has a characteristic bifurcated tail, classically called furcae (Latin for fork); hence, the name (derived from a Greek word κέρκος, kerkos, meaning tail). The tail is highly flexible and its beating propels the cercaria in water. It is about 0.2 mm long and 47 μm wide, somewhat loosely attached to the main body. The body is pear-shaped and measures 0.24 mm in length and 0.1 mm in width. Its tegument is fully covered with spine. A conspicuous oral sucker is at the apex. As a non-feeding larva, there are no elaborate digestive organs, only oesophagus is distinct. There are three pairs of mucin glands connected to laterally to the oral sucker at the region of the ventral sucker.

== Physiology ==
=== Feeding and nutrition ===
Developing Schistosoma mansoni worms that have infected their definitive hosts, prior to the sexual pairing of males and females, require a nutrient source in order to properly develop from cercariae to adults. The developing parasites lyse host red blood cells to gain access to nutrients and also makes its own fungi from its waste it is hard to detect; the hemoglobin and amino acids the blood cells contain can be used by the worm to form proteins. While hemoglobin is digested intracellularly, initiated by salivary gland enzymes, iron waste products cannot be used by the worms, and are typically discarded via regurgitation.

Kasschau et al. (1995) tested the effect of temperature and pH on the ability of developing S. mansoni to lyse red blood cells. The researchers found that the parasites were best able to destroy red blood cells for their nutrients at a pH of 5.1 and a temperature of 37 °C.

=== Locomotion ===
Schistosoma mansoni is locomotive in primarily two stages of its life cycle: as cercariae swimming freely through a body of freshwater to locate the epidermis of their human hosts, and as developing and fully-fledged adults, migrating throughout their primary host upon infection. Cercariae are attracted to the presence of fatty acids on the skin of their definitive host, and the parasite responds to changes in light and temperature in their freshwater medium to navigate towards the skin. Ressurreicao et al. (2015) tested the roles of various protein kinases in the ability of the parasite to navigate its medium and locate a penetrable host surface. Extracellular signal-regulated kinase and protein kinase C both respond to changes in medium temperature and light levels, and the stimulation of p38 mitogen-activated protein kinase, associated with recognition of parasite host surface, results in a glandular secretion that deteriorates the host epidermis, and allows the parasite to burrow into its host.

The parasite's nervous system contains bilobed ganglia and several nerve cords which splay out to every surface of the body; serotonin is a transmitter distributed widely throughout the nervous system and plays an important role in nervous reception, and stimulating mobility.

== Life cycle ==
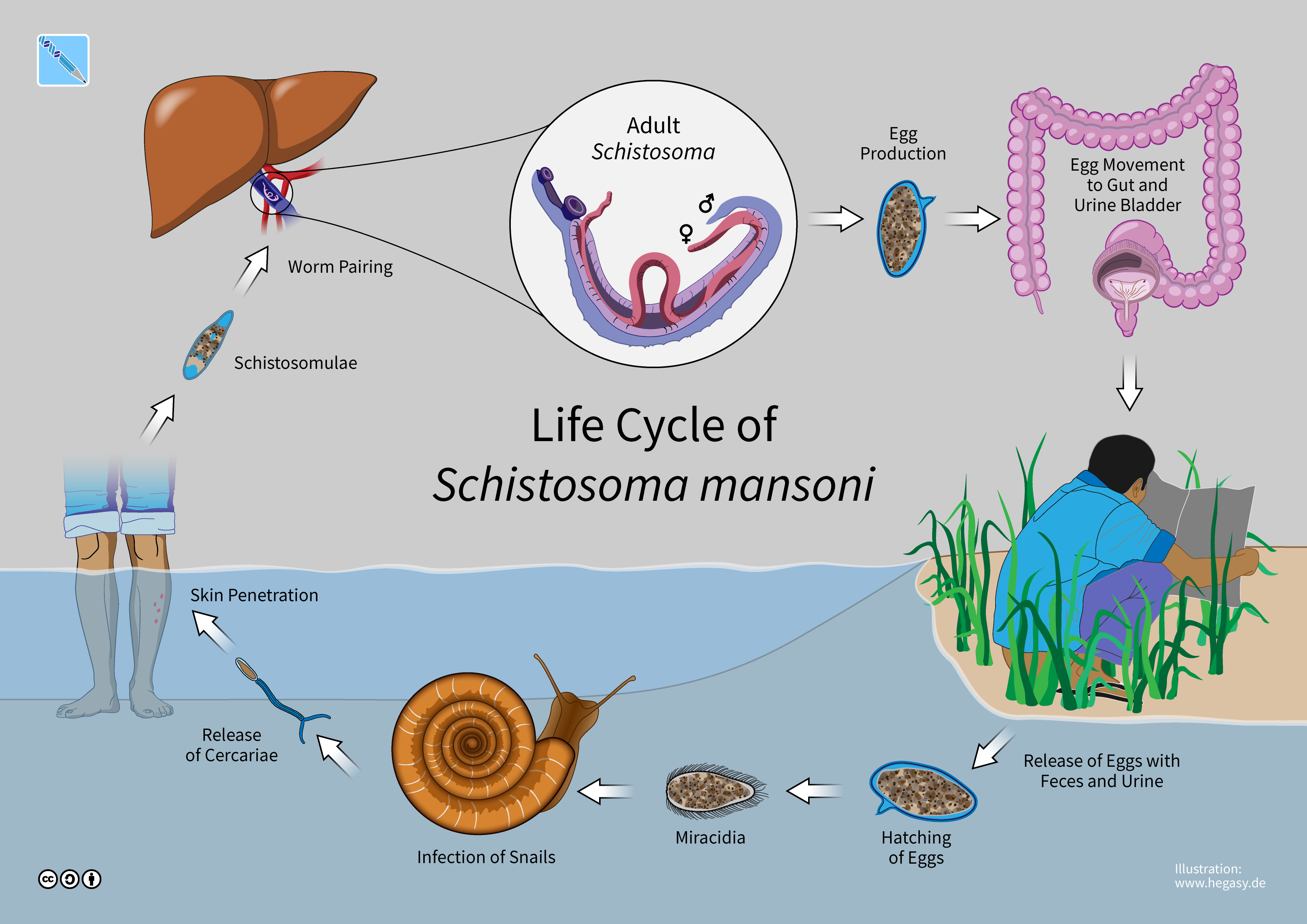
Life cycle of Schistosoma mansoni

=== Intermediate host ===
After the eggs of the human-dwelling parasite are emitted in the faeces and into the water, the ripe miracidium hatches out of the egg. The hatching happens in response to temperature, light and dilution of faeces with water. The miracidium searches for a suitable freshwater snail belonging to the genus Biomphalaria. In South America, the principal intermediate host is Biomphalaria glabrata, while B. straminea and B. tenagophila are less common. A land snail Achatina fulica was reported in 2010 to act as a host in Venezuela. In Africa, B. glabratra, B. pfeifferi, B. choanomphala and B. sudanica act as the hosts; but in Egypt, the main snail host is B. alexandrina.

Miracidia directly penetrate the soft tissue of snail. Inside the snail, they lose their cilia and develop into mother sporocysts. The sporocysts rapidly multiply by asexual reproduction, each forming numerous daughter sporocysts. The daughter sporocysts move to the liver and gonads of the snail, where they undergo further growth. Within 2–4 weeks, they undergo metamorphosis and give rise to fork-tailed cercariae. Stimulated by light, hundreds of cercariae penetrate out of the snail into water.

=== Definitive host ===
The cercaria emerge from the snail during daylight and they propel themselves in water with the aid of their bifurcated tail, actively seeking out their final host. In water, they can live for up to 12 hours, and their maximum infectivity is between 1 and 9 hours after emergence. When they recognise human skin, they penetrate it within a very short time. This occurs in three stages, an initial attachment to the skin, followed by the creeping over the skin searching for a suitable penetration site, often a hair follicle, and finally penetration of the skin into the epidermis using cytolytic secretions from the cercarial post-acetabular, then pre-acetabular glands. On penetration, the head of the cercaria transforms into an endoparasitic larva, the schistosomule. Each schistosomule spends a few days in the skin and then enters the circulation starting at the dermal lymphatics and venules. Here, they feed on blood, regurgitating the haem as hemozoin. The schistosomule migrates to the lungs (5–7 days post-penetration) and then moves via circulation through the left side of the heart to the hepatoportal circulation (>15 days) where, if it meets a partner of the opposite sex, it develops into a sexually mature adult and the pair migrate to the mesenteric veins. Such pairings are monogamous.

Male schistosomes undergo normal maturation and morphological development in the presence or absence of a female, although behavioural, physiological and antigenic differences between males from single-sex, as opposed to bisex, infections have been reported. On the other hand, female schistosomes do not mature without a male. Female schistosomes from single-sex infections are underdeveloped and exhibit an immature reproductive system. Although the maturation of the female worm seems to be dependent on the presence of the mature male, the stimuli for female growth and for reproductive development seem to be independent from each other.

The adult female worm resides within the adult male worm's gynaecophoric canal, which is a modification of the ventral surface of the male, forming a groove. The paired worms move against the flow of blood to their final niche in the mesenteric circulation, where they begin egg production (>32 days). The S. mansoni parasites are found predominantly in the small inferior mesenteric blood vessels surrounding the large intestine and caecal region of the host. Each female lays approximately 300 eggs a day (one egg every 4.8 minutes), which are deposited on the endothelial lining of the venous capillary walls. Most of the body mass of female schistosomes is devoted to the reproductive system. The female converts the equivalent of almost her own body dry weight into eggs each day. The eggs move into the lumen of the host's intestines and are released into the environment with the faeces.

== Genome ==
Schistosoma mansoni has eight pairs of chromosomes (2n = 16): seven autosomal pairs and one sex pair. The female schistosome is heterogametic, or ZW, and the male is homogametic, or ZZ. Sex is determined in the zygote by a chromosomal mechanism. The genome is approximately 270 MB with a GC content of 34%, 4–8% highly repetitive sequence, 32–36% middle repetitive sequence and 60% single copy sequence. Numerous highly or moderately repetitive elements are identified, with at least 30% repetitive DNA. Chromosomes range in size from 18 to 73 MB and can be distinguished by size, shape, and C banding.

In 2000, the first BAC library of Schistosome was constructed. In June 2003, a ~5x whole genome shotgun sequencing project was initiated at the Sanger Institute. Also in 2003, 163,000 ESTs (expressed sequence tags) were generated (by a consortium headed by the University of São Paulo) from six selected developmental stages of this parasite, resulting in 31,000 assembled sequences and an estimated 92% of the 14,000-gene complement.

In 2009 the genomes of both S. mansoni and S. japonicum were published, with each describing 11,809 and 13,469 genes, respectively. S. mansoni genome has increased protease families and deficiencies in lipid anabolism; which are attributed to its parasitic adaptation. Proteases included the invadolysin (host penetration) and cathepsin (blood-feeding) gene families.

In 2012, an improved version of the S. mansoni genome was published, which consisted of only 885 scaffolds and more than 81% of the bases organised into chromosomes. The new genome sequence had 10,852 protein-coding genes and the corrected genome size was 364 Mb.

=== Functional analysis ===
In 2019, Ittiprasert and colleagues demonstrated that CRISPR/Cas9 gene editing can be used in schistosomes by targeting the gene encoding the T2 ribonuclease of Schistosoma mansoni.

== Pathology ==
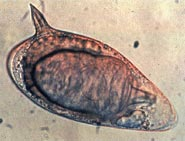
A Schistosoma mansoni egg with the characteristic lateral spine

Schistosome eggs, which may become lodged within the host's tissues, are the major cause of pathology in schistosomiasis. Some of the deposited eggs reach the outside environment by passing through the wall of the intestine; the rest are swept into the circulation and are filtered out in the periportal tracts of the liver, resulting in periportal fibrosis. Onset of egg laying in humans is sometimes associated with an onset of fever (Katayama fever). This "acute schistosomiasis" is not, however, as important as the chronic forms of the disease. For S. mansoni and S. japonicum, these are "intestinal" and "hepatic schistosomiasis", associated with formation of granulomas around trapped eggs lodged in the intestinal wall or in the liver, respectively. The hepatic form of the disease is the most important, granulomas here giving rise to fibrosis of the liver and hepatosplenomegaly in severe cases. Symptoms and signs depend on the number and location of eggs trapped in the tissues. Initially, the inflammatory reaction is readily reversible. In the latter stages of the disease, the pathology is associated with collagen deposition and fibrosis, resulting in organ damage that may be only partially reversible.

Granuloma formation is initiated by antigens secreted by the miracidium through microscopic pores within the rigid egg shell, and the immune response to granuloma, rather than the direct action of egg antigens, causes the symptoms. The granulomas formed around the eggs impair blood flow in the liver and, as a consequence, induce portal hypertension. With time, collateral circulation is formed and the eggs disseminate into the lungs, where they cause more granulomas, pulmonary arteritis and, later, cor pulmonale. A contributory factor to portal hypertension is Symmers' fibrosis, which develops around branches of the portal veins. This fibrosis occurs only many years after the infection and is presumed to be caused in part by soluble egg antigens and various immune cells that react to them.

Recent research has shown that granuloma size is consistent with levels of IL-13, which plays a prominent role in granuloma formation and granuloma size. IL-13 receptor α 2 (IL-13Rα2) binds IL-13 with high affinity and blocks the effects of IL-13. Thus, this receptor is essential in preventing the progression of schistosomiasis from the acute to the chronic (and deadly) stage of disease. Synthetic IL-13Rα2 given to mice has resulted in significant decreases in granuloma size, implicating IL-13Rα2 as an important target in schistosomiasis.

S. mansoni infection often occurs alongside those of viral hepatitis, either hepatitis B virus (HBV) or hepatitis C virus (HCV). This is due to high prevalence of schistosomiasis in areas where chronic viral hepatitis is prevalent. One important factor was the development of large reservoir of infection due to extensive schistosomiasis control programs that used intravenously administered tartar emetic since the 1960s. Co-infection is known to cause earlier liver deterioration and more severe illness.

=== Evasion of host immunity ===
Adult and larval worms migrate through the host's blood circulation avoiding the host's immune system. The worms have many tools that help in this evasion, including the tegument, antioxidant proteins, and defenses against host membrane attack complex (MAC). The tegument coats the worm and acts as a physical barrier to host antibodies and complement. Host immune defenses are capable of producing superoxide, but these are counterattacked by antioxidant proteins produced by the parasite. Schistosomes have four superoxide dismutases, and levels of these proteins increase as the schistosome grows. Antioxidant pathways were first recognised as a chokepoints for schistosomes, and later extended to other trematodes and cestodes. Targeting of this pathway with different inhibitors of the central antioxidant enzyme thioredoxin glutathione reductase (TGR) results in reduced viability of worms. Decay accelerating factor (DAF) protein is present on the parasite tegument and protects host cells by blocking formation of MAC. In addition, schistosomes have six homologues of human CD59 which are strong inhibitors of MAC.

=== Diagnosis ===
The presence of S. mansoni is detected by microscopic examination of parasite eggs in stool. A staining method called Kato-Katz technique is used for stool examination. It involves methylene blue-stained cellophane soaked in glycerine or glass slides. A costlier technique called formalin-ether concentration technique (FECT) is often used in combination with the direct faecal smear for higher accuracy. Serological and immunological tests are also available. Antibodies and antigens can be detected in the blood using ELISA to identify infection. Adult worm antigens can be detected by indirect haemagglutination assays (IHAs). Polymerase chain reaction (PCR) is also used for detecting the parasite DNA. Circulating cathodic antigen (CCA) in urine can be tested with lateral flow immune-chromatographic reagent strip and point-of-care (POC) tests.

Egg detection and immunologic tests are not particularly sensitive. Polymerase chain reaction (PCR) based testing is accurate and rapid. However, this is not frequently used in countries where the disease is common due to the cost of the equipment and the technical expertise required to run them. Using a microscope to detect eggs costs about US$0.40 per test while PCR is about US$7 per test as of 2019. Loop-mediated isothermal amplification (LAMP) is being studied as it is lower cost. LAMP testing is not commercially available as of 2019.

=== Treatment ===
The standard drug for S. mansoni infection is praziquantel at a dose of 40 mg/kg. Oxamniquine is also used.

== Epidemiology ==
As of 2021, 251.4 million people worldwide are having schistosomiasis due to different species of Schistosoma. More than 75 million people were given medical treatment. S. mansoni is the major species causing an annual death of about 130,000. It is endemic in 55 countries and most prevalent in Africa, the Middle East, the Caribbean, Brazil, Venezuela and Suriname. About 80-85% of schistosomiasis is found in sub-Saharan Africa, where S. haematobium, S. intercalatum and S. mansoni are endemic. Approximately 393 million Africans are at risk of infection from S. mansoni, of which about 55 million are infected at any moment. Annual death due to S. mansoni is about 130,000. The prevalence rate in different countries of Africa are: 73.9% in northern Ethiopia, 37.9% in western Ethiopia, 56% in Nigeria, 60.5% in Kenya, 64.3% in Tanzania, 19.8% in Ghana, and 53.8% in Côte d'Ivoire. In Egypt, 60% of the population in the Northern and Eastern parts of the Nile Delta and only 6% in the Southern part are infected.

S. mansoni is commonly found in places with poor sanitation. Because of the parasite's fecal-oral transmission, bodies of water that contain human waste can be infectious. Water that contains large populations of the intermediate host snail species is more likely to cause infection. Young children living in these areas are at greatest risk because of their tendency to swim and bathe in cercaria-infected waters longer than adults . Anyone travelling to the areas described above, and who is exposed to contaminated water, is at risk of schistosomiasis.

== History ==
The intermediate hosts Biomphalaria snails are estimated to originate in South America 95–110 million years ago. But the parasites Schistosoma originated in Asia. In Africa, the progenitor species evolved into modern S. mansoni and S. haematobium around 2–5 million years ago.

A German physician Theodor Maximillian Bilharz was the first to discover the parasite in 1851, while working at Kasr el-Aini Hospital, a medical school in Cairo. Bilharz recovered them from autopsies of dead soldiers, and noticed two distinct parasites. He described one of them as Distomum haematobium (now S. haematobium) in 1852, but failed to identify the other. In one of his letters to his mentor Karl Theordor von Siebold, he mentioned some of the eggs were different in having terminal spines while some had lateral spines. Terminal-spined eggs are unique to S. haematobium, while lateral spines are found only in S. mansoni. Bilharz also noted that the adult flukes were different in anatomy and number of eggs they produced. He introduced the terms bilharzia and bilharziasis for the name of the infection in 1856. A German zoologist David Friedrich Weinland corrected the genus name to Schistosoma in 1858; and introduced the disease name as schistosomiasis.

The species distinction was first recognised by Patrick Manson at the London School of Hygiene & Tropical Medicine. Manson identified lateral-spined eggs in the faeces of a colonial officer earlier posted to the West Indies, and concluded that there were two species of Schistosoma. An Italian-British physician Louis Westenra Sambon gave the new names Schistosomum haematobium and Schistosomum mansoni in 1907, the latter to honour Manson. Sambon only gave partial description using a male worm. In 1908, a Brazilian physician Manuel Augusto Pirajá da Silva gave a complete description of male and female worms, including the lateral-spined eggs. Pirajá da Silva obtained specimens from three necropsies and eggs from 20 stool examinations in Bahia. He gave the name S. americanum. The species identity was confirmed in 1907 by British parasitologist Robert Thomson Leiper, identifying the specific snail host, and distinguishing the egg structure, thereby establishing the life cycle.
