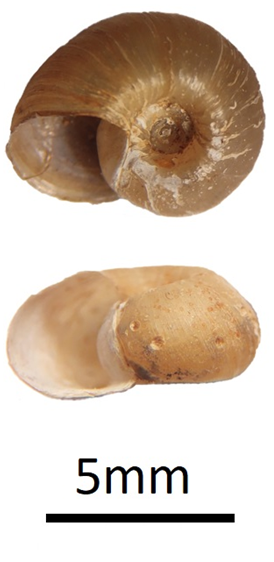
- Apical and apertural view of Biomphalaria choanomphala.

Scientific classification
- Kingdom: Animalia
- Phylum: Mollusca
- Class: Gastropoda
- Superorder: Hygrophila
- Family: Planorbidae
- Genus: Biomphalaria
- Species: B. choanomphala

Binomial name
- Biomphalaria choanomphala (E.von Martens, 1879)

= Biomphalaria choanomphala =

Species of mollusc

Biomphalaria choanomphala is a species of air-breathing freshwater snail, an aquatic pulmonate gastropod in the family Planorbidae, the ram's horn snails. Biomphalaria choanomphala has a discoidal, brownish-yellow shell with an approximate shell diameter of 6–10 mm. Biomphalaria choanomphala is a medically important pest, due to it being an intermediate host of the intravascular trematode genus, Schistosoma.

== Habitat and distribution ==
Biomphalaria choanomphala is an African species found in freshwater habitats such as rivers, streams, and ponds. Their head has a pair of tentacles with eyes at the base, and a siphon for breathing and waste elimination. It is known to prefer slow-moving water with vegetation, where it feeds on algae and detritus.

Distribution of Biomphalaria choanomphala include:

- East Africa: Lake Victoria (Kenya, Tanzanian and Uganda).

== Ecology and behavior ==
Biomphalaria choanomphala is known to be an intermediate host for the parasitic flatworms Schistosoma mansoni, which is responsible for causing intestinal schistosomiasis in humans. The snail's role as an intermediate host allows the parasite to complete its life cycle and infect humans who come into contact with contaminated water sources where it inhabits.

In addition to its role in transmitting parasites, Biomphalaria choanomphala also plays an important ecological role in its freshwater habitat. The snail feeds on algae and detritus, helping to regulate the nutrient balance of the ecosystem. It also serves as a food source for many predators, including fish, birds, and other invertebrates.

== Conservation status and biological importance ==
Biomphalaria choanomphala is not considered a threatened species, and its population is stable in its native range. However, the species' role as an intermediate host for schistosomiasis makes it an important target for disease control programs. Constant efforts are underway to reduce the incidence of schistosomiasis by controlling the snail population through chemical treatments and biological control methods.

== Phylogeny ==
Biomphalaria choanomphala is a part of the "Nilotic Species Complex" alongside B. alexandrina, B. angulosa, B. smithi, B. stanleyi and B. sudanica.

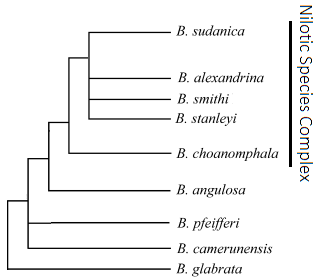
Phylogenetic tree of the African Biomphalaria species

== Ecological phenotypes ==
Biomphalaria choanomphala has been the subject of multiple ecological and genetic studies, which have revealed its shell morphology can vary as a result of environmental factors. Several studies have shown that B. choanomphala snails found within Lake Victoria have very different conchological morphologies, but are very similar genetically, suggesting these snails are likely a single species expressing two ecophenotypes.

Previous conchological morphology studies of Biomphalaria snails have categorised their species based on whether they exhibited a "lacustrine" (found within a lake) or a "non-lacustrine" shell morphology (found elsewhere). In the case of B. choanomphala, its commonly associated with having a lacustrine morphotype (morphotype-B), while the non-lacustrine morphotype (morphotype-A) is commonly mistaken for another African Biomphalaria species, B. sudanica.

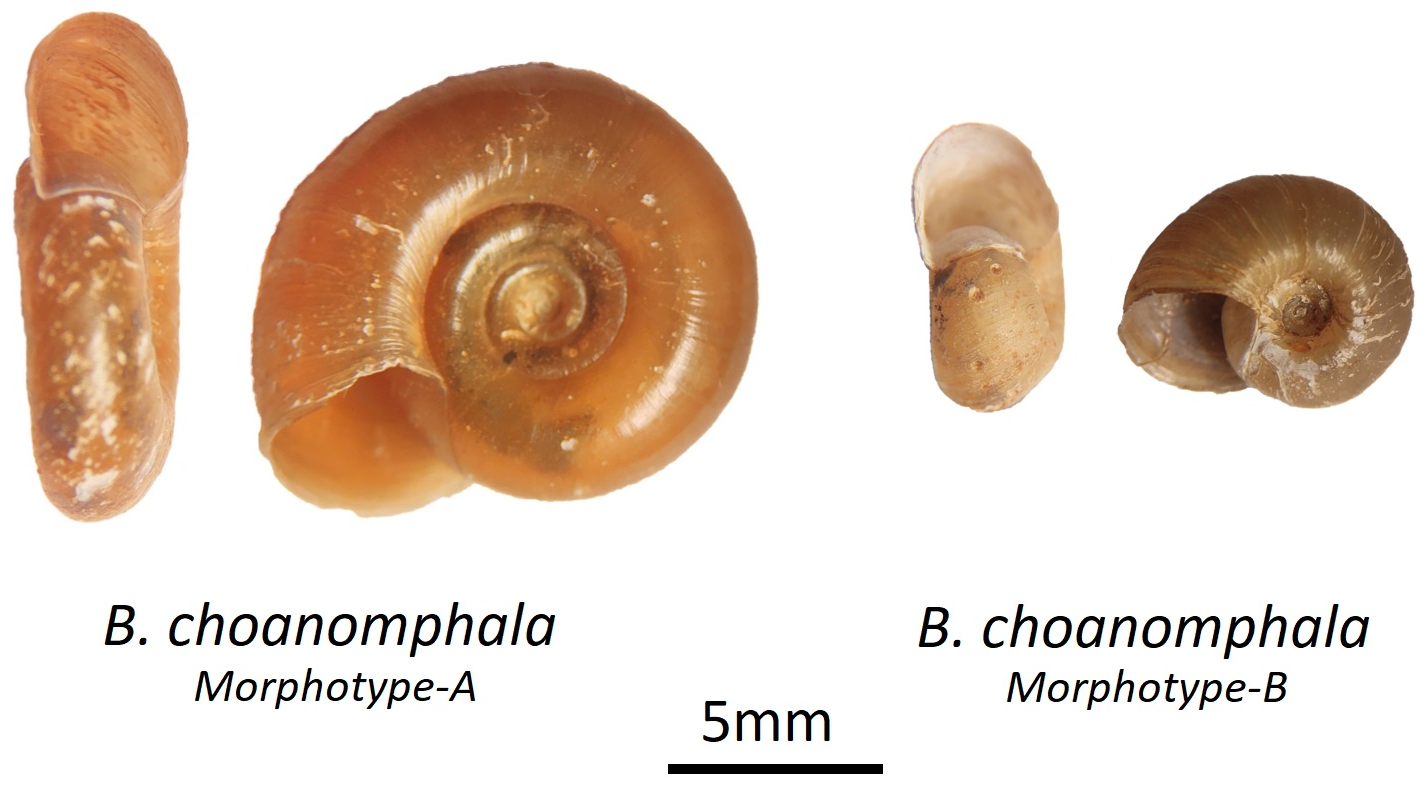
Ecological phenotypes (ecophenotypes) of Biomphalaria choanomphala
