= Biomphalaria camerunensis =

Scientific classification
- Kingdom: Animalia
- Phylum: Mollusca
- Class: Gastropoda
- Superorder: Hygrophila
- Family: Planorbidae
- Genus: Biomphalaria
- Species: B. camerunensis

Binomial name
- Biomphalaria camerunensis (Boettger, 1941)

Species of mollusc

Biomphalaria camerunensis is a species of gastropods belonging to the family Planorbidae.

The species is found in freshwater environments.
