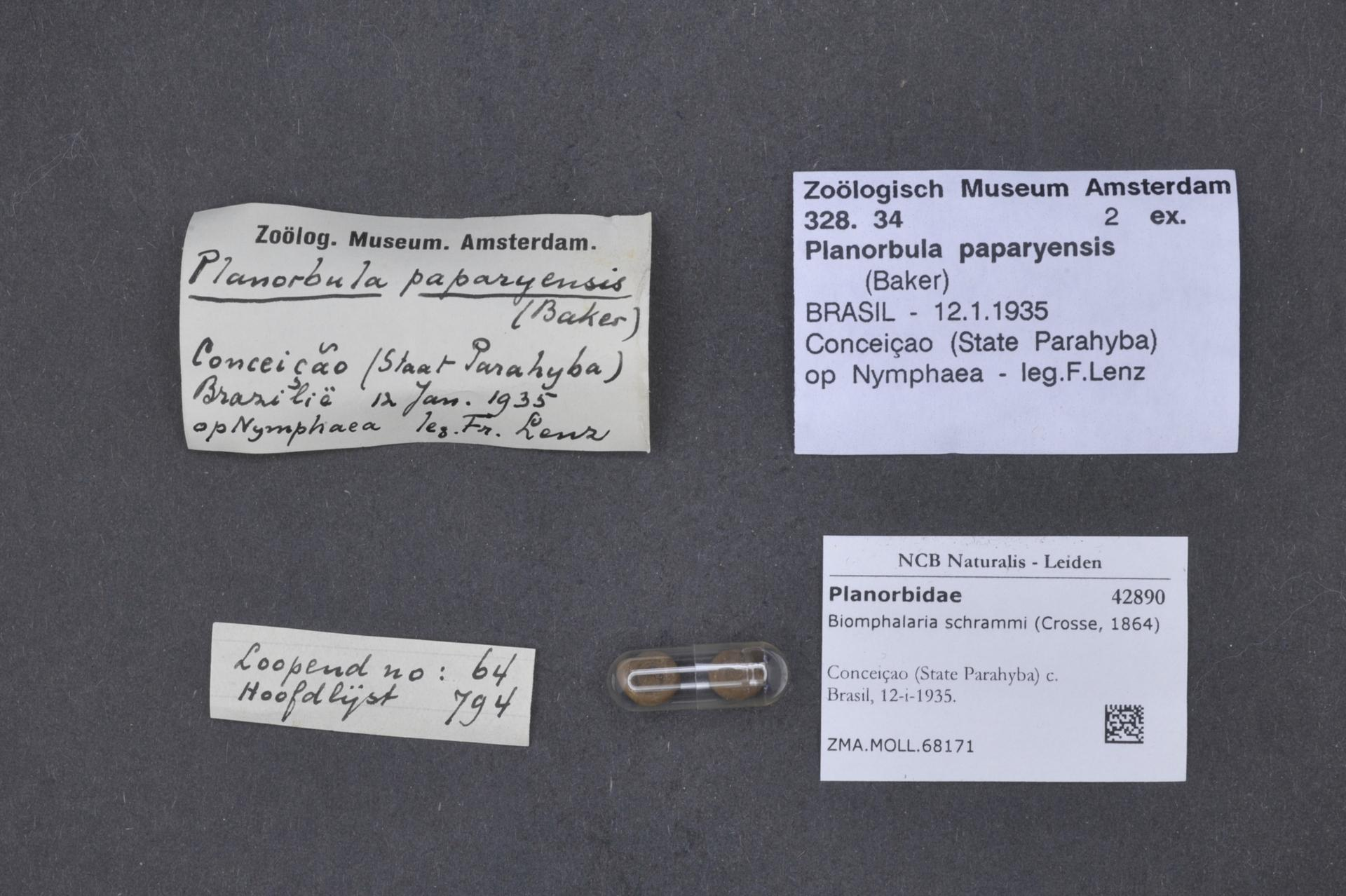

Scientific classification
- Kingdom: Animalia
- Phylum: Mollusca
- Class: Gastropoda
- Superorder: Hygrophila
- Family: Planorbidae
- Genus: Biomphalaria
- Species: B. schrammi

Binomial name
- Biomphalaria schrammi (Crosse, 1864)

= Biomphalaria schrammi =

Species of mollusc

Biomphalaria schrammi is a species of gastropods belonging to the family Planorbidae.

The species is found in Southern America.
