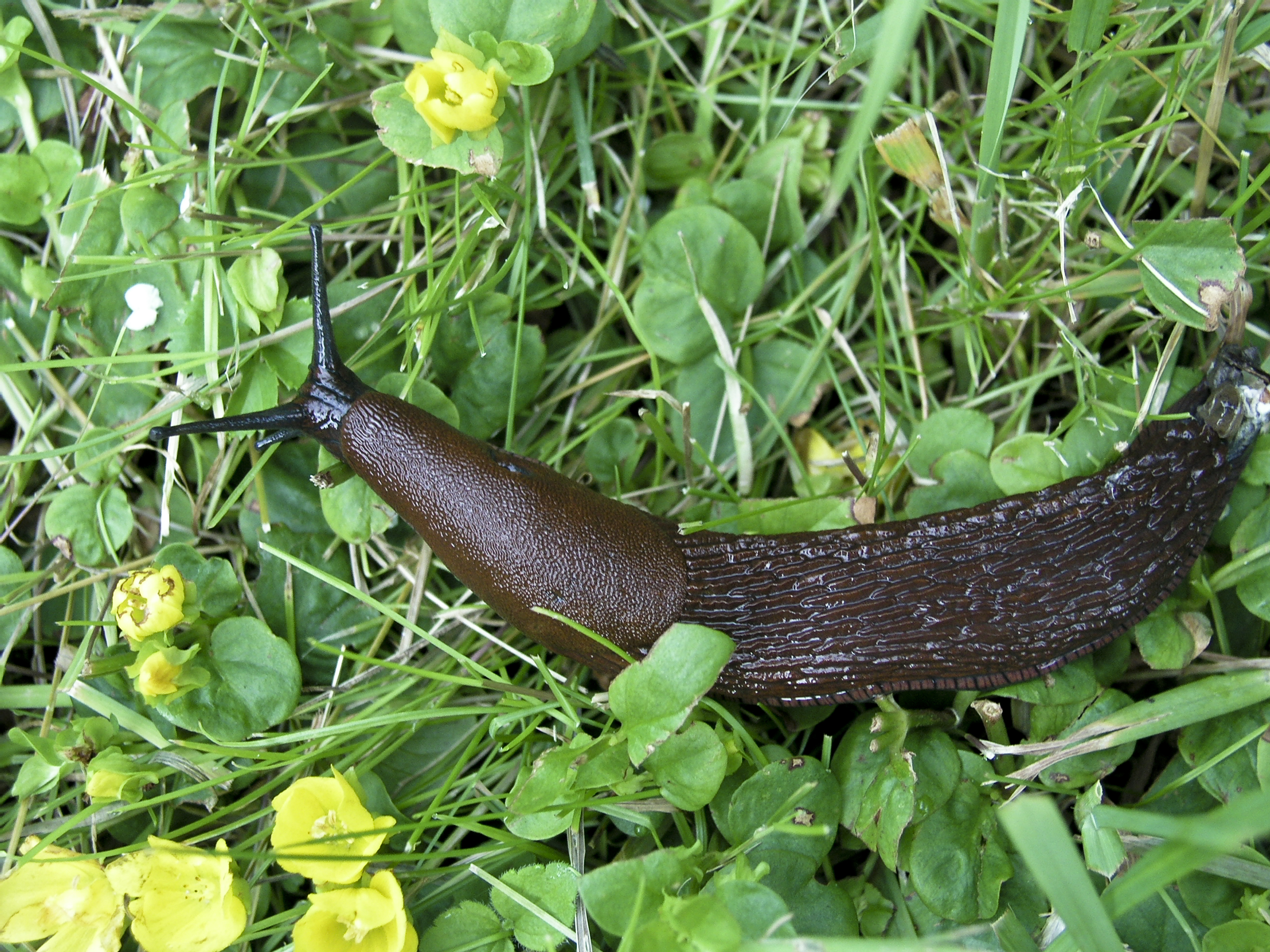

Conservation status
- Least Concern (IUCN 3.1)

Scientific classification
- Kingdom: Animalia
- Phylum: Mollusca
- Class: Gastropoda
- Order: Stylommatophora
- Family: Arionidae
- Genus: Arion
- Species: A. vulgaris

Binomial name
- Arion vulgaris Moquin-Tandon, 1855

Synonyms
- Arion (Arion) vulgaris Moquin-Tandon, 1855 alternative representation; Arion rufus var. vulgaris Moquin-Tandon, 1855; Arion lusitanicus auct. non Mabille

= Spanish slug =

Species of gastropod

The Spanish slug (Arion vulgaris, but formerly widely referred to as Arion lusitanicus owing to a misidentification) is an air-breathing land slug, a terrestrial pulmonate gastropod mollusk in the family Arionidae, the roundback slugs.

Other vernacular names are Lusitanian slug, Iberian slug, and killer slug.

It is a large, conspicuous slug, which has spread across much of Europe since the 1950s and now reached North America. It may attain high densities and can be a serious horticultural and agricultural problem, and is considered an invasive species. The life cycle is annual, with adults appearing in summer and dying off before winter.

== Confusion over nomenclature ==
The Spanish slug was identified as Arion lusitanicus when it was first reported as an invading species in France in 1956, and hence it is sometimes called the Lusitanian slug (e.g.). This was a case of misidentification. In slugs, it is often impossible to find external characters that distinguish closely related species using external features, as colouration can be quite variable, and the rather plastic anatomy makes diagnostic anatomical features difficult to establish. The current consensus is that the true Arion lusitanicus is a species of the western part of the Iberian Peninsula. Examination of slugs from the Serra da Arrábida mountains in Portugal from where it was originally described by Jules François Mabille in 1868 showed that the true A. lusitanicus differed from the invader in its internal anatomy, the shape of the spermatophore and the number of chromosomes.

The misidentification was first recognised in 1997, and more widely publicised in an atlas of British molluscs. Arion vulgaris was proposed as a substitute name based on a drawing of the genitalia in an 1855 work by Alfred Moquin-Tandon. However, it is debatable whether the name applies to this drawing, so one temporary solution was to use the name Arion lusitanicus auct. non Mabille (i.e. "as used by authors other than Mabille"). Nevertheless, A. vulgaris has increasingly been used since, and this is the proposal that has been formally submitted to the International Commission on Zoological Nomenclature.

It has been erroneously reported that the slug was originally introduced via vegetables from Spain. These reports are usually based on outdated information published in pre-1999 literature. The common name "Spanish slug" was further based on the unsubstantiated assumption that the species would not only live in Portugal, but also in Spain. Arion vulgaris seems to be rare in Spain. Another name sometimes applied is the "Iberian slug".

== Distribution ==
The native distribution of Arion vulgaris is not exactly known. Genetic evidence (the higher incidence of rare alleles) suggests an origin in France or Spain, contrary to earlier genetic analyses that did not adequately sample these regions. In Britain the slug was first recorded in 1954, which is not an indication of it being native there. It is presumed that the specimen illustrated in Moquin-Tandon's original 1855 description was from France.

=== Non-indigenous distribution ===
The non-indigenous distribution of Arion vulgaris includes almost the whole of Western and Central Europe and extends to various parts of Southern, Northern and Eastern Europe. The first confirmed Asian records were in 2022 from Armenia and from the Pacific coast of Russia. A 2017 report from the Asian part of Turkey was not based on dissection and is liable to be A. ater s.l. Arion vulgaris is now also recorded from Canada (2009) and Mexico. Reports of "A. lusitanicus" from Madeira may be copied from an 1895 report, in which case they need confirmation; similarly, a 1975 report from the Azores could be of the true A. lusitanicus. Claims of its presence in Algeria also appear unsupported.

Chronological overview of expansion of Arion vulgaris in Europe:

- Great Britain – since 1954, later spread to Lincolnshire and Norfolk in 2012
- France – (expansion from native range) since 1955
- Switzerland – since at least 1956
- Italy – since 1965
- Bulgaria – since 1966
- Germany – since 1969

Arion vulgaris is opening its pneumostome.

- Austria – since 1971
- Belgium – since 1973
- Sweden – since 1975
- Slovenia – since 1982–83
- Croatia – since 1982–83
- Ireland – since 1984
- Hungary – since 1985
- Poland – likely since 1987, certainly by 1993
- Norway – since 1988
- Netherlands – since 1989
- Spain – (possibly native; only known from north-east) since 1990
- Finland – since 1990; abundant in south
- Czech Republic – since 1991
- Denmark – since 1991
- Slovakia – since 1992
- Faroe Islands – since 1996
- Serbia – since 2002
- Montenegro – since 2002
- Iceland – since 2003
- Macedonia – since at least 2003
- Ukraine – since 2007, subsequently spread across almost whole country
- Lithuania – since 2008
- Estonia – since 2008
- Latvia – since 2009
- Russia – since 2009 (greenhouses), since 2019 (outdoors), unconfirmed outdoor reports 2015
- Romania – since 2012
- Belarus – since 2020 (2018 record not confirmed anatomically)

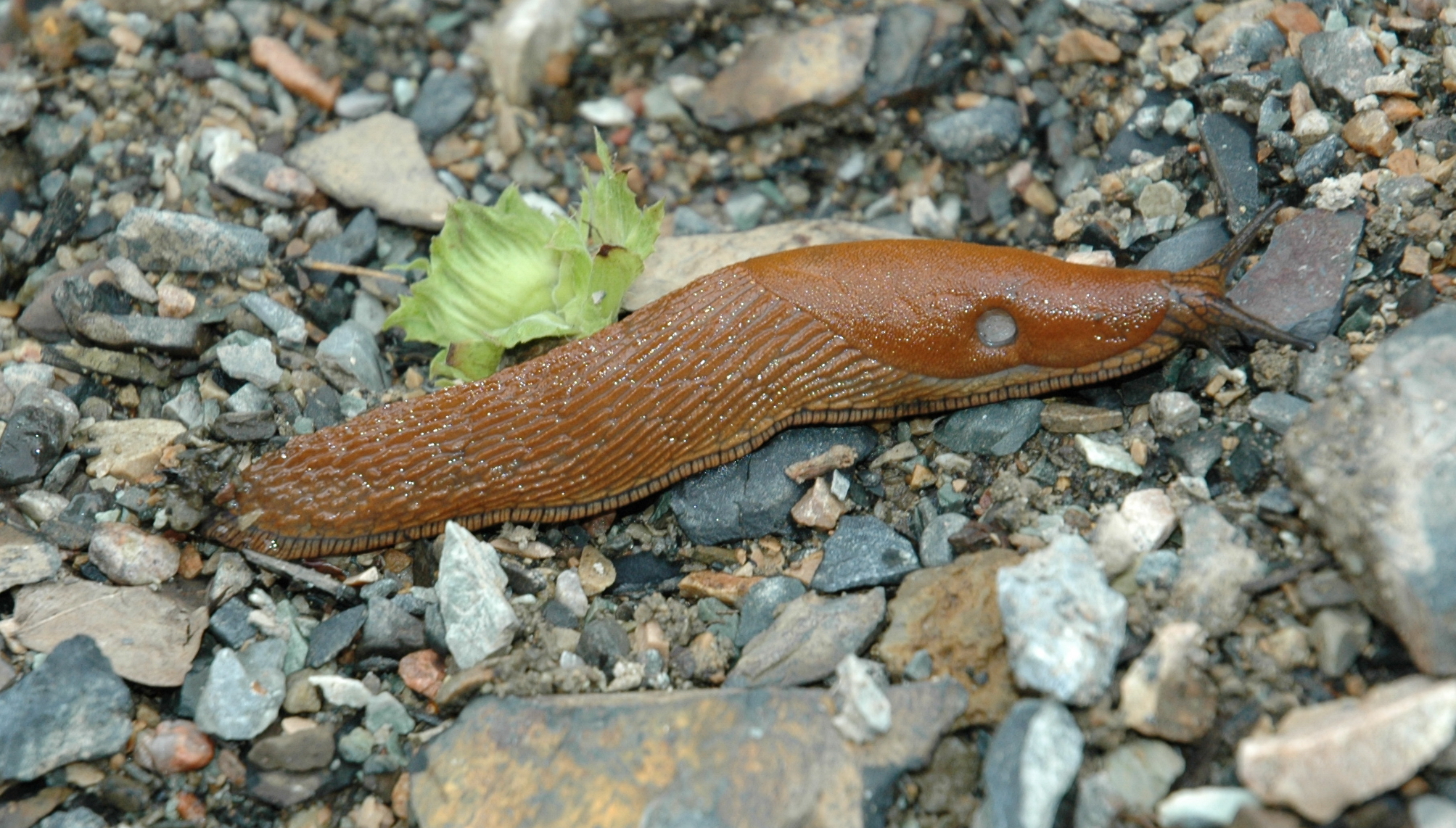
An adult of Arion vulgaris

This species has not yet become established in the USA, but it is considered to represent a potentially serious threat as a pest, an invasive species which could negatively affect agriculture, natural ecosystems, human health or commerce. Therefore, it has been suggested that this species be given top national quarantine significance in the USA.

British authorities were also concerned as of 2014 that it may become a major pest.

== Description ==
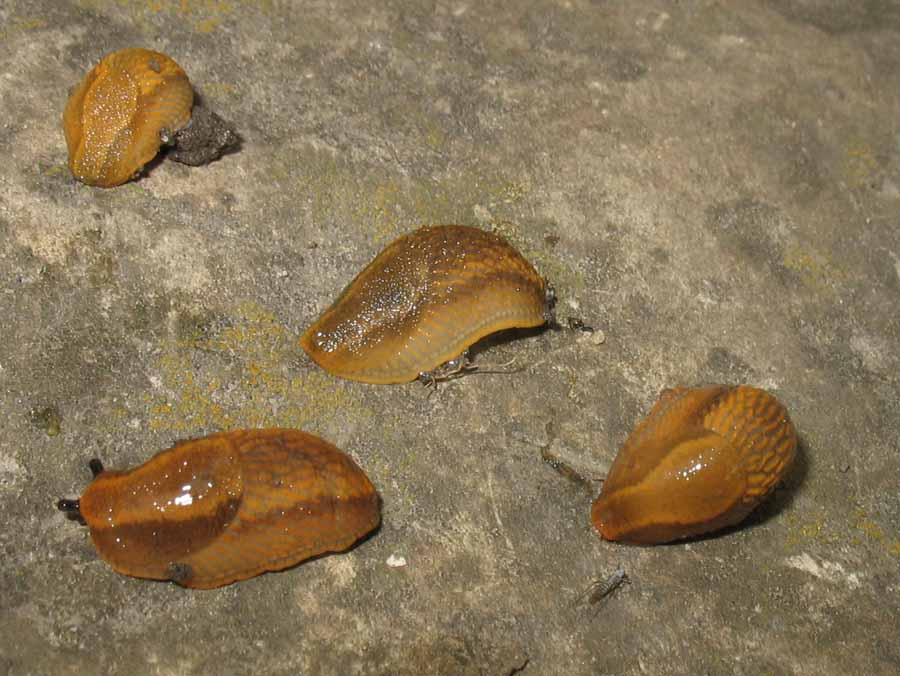
Juveniles of Arion vulgaris

The size of the adult slug is 60–140 mm. The colour ranges from yellow to black, but is most commonly brick-red, dirty orange, or brown. The tentacles are darker. Adult A. vulgaris may not differ in external appearance from Arion rufus, and so reliable identification requires dissection to examine the genitalia. In contrast, the juveniles of these species can be distinguished because only A. vulgaris has longitudinal bands. However, juveniles of other large Arion species such as Arion flagellus also have longitudinal bands.

Reproductive system: The atrium is small. The adjacent part of the oviduct is dilated and muscular, with the same diameter as the atrium and containing a longitudinal ligula. This distinguishes A. vulgaris from Arion ater s.l., in which the oviduct is thinner and the atrium is larger and contains the ligula. Arion flagellus also has a ligula in the dilated part of the oviduct, but the ligula does not reach as far towards the atrium as in A. vulgaris. The spermatheca is spherical, its diameter twice that of the oviduct.

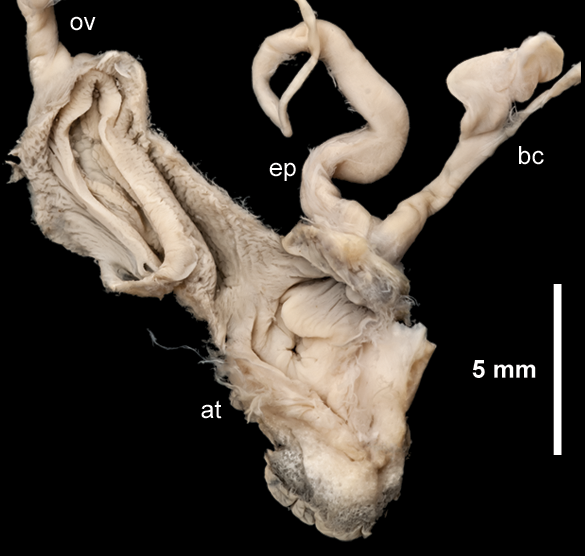
The reproductive system of Arion vulgaris is important for species identification: at = atrium; bc = bursa copulatrix; ep = epiphallus; ov = oviduct

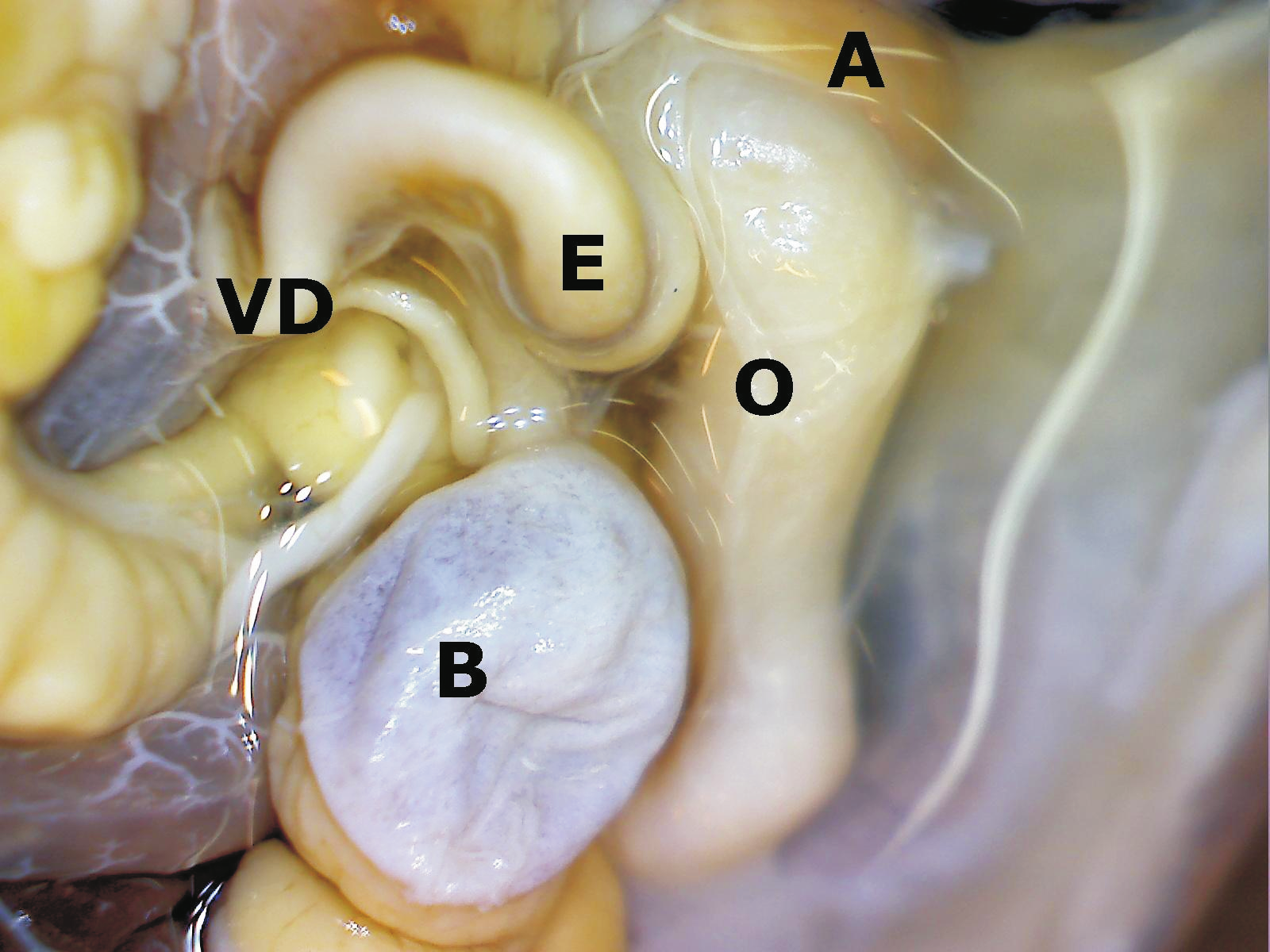
Reproductive system of Arion vulgaris showing small and short atrium (A), and the long, muscular distal part of the oviduct (O). E – epiphallus; VD – vas deferens; B – bursa copulatrix

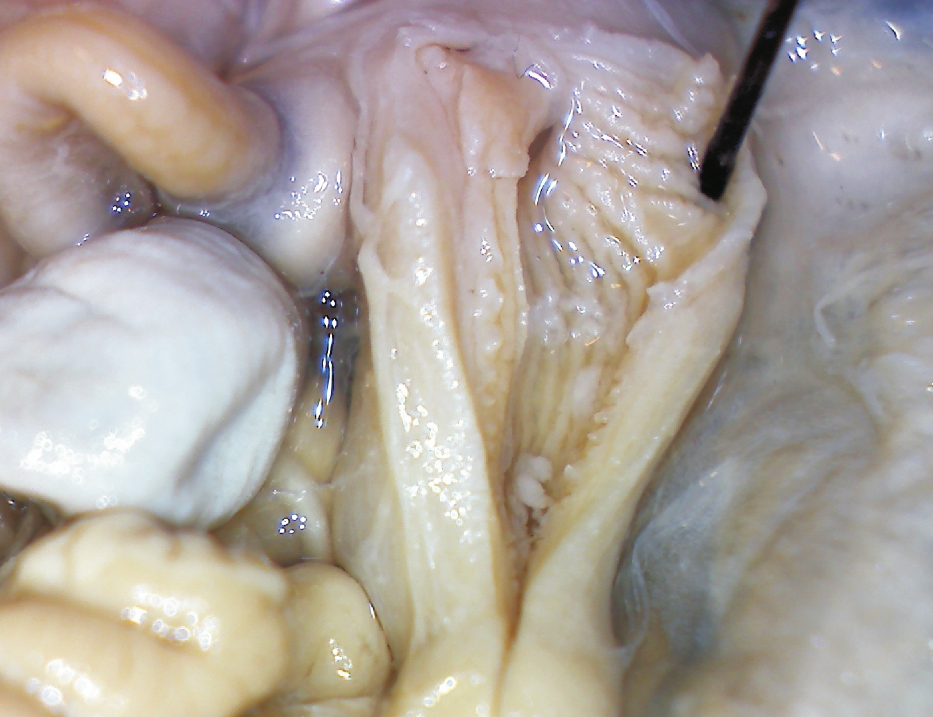
Reproductive system of Arion vulgaris showing long folds (ligula) inside the oviduct

== Ecology ==
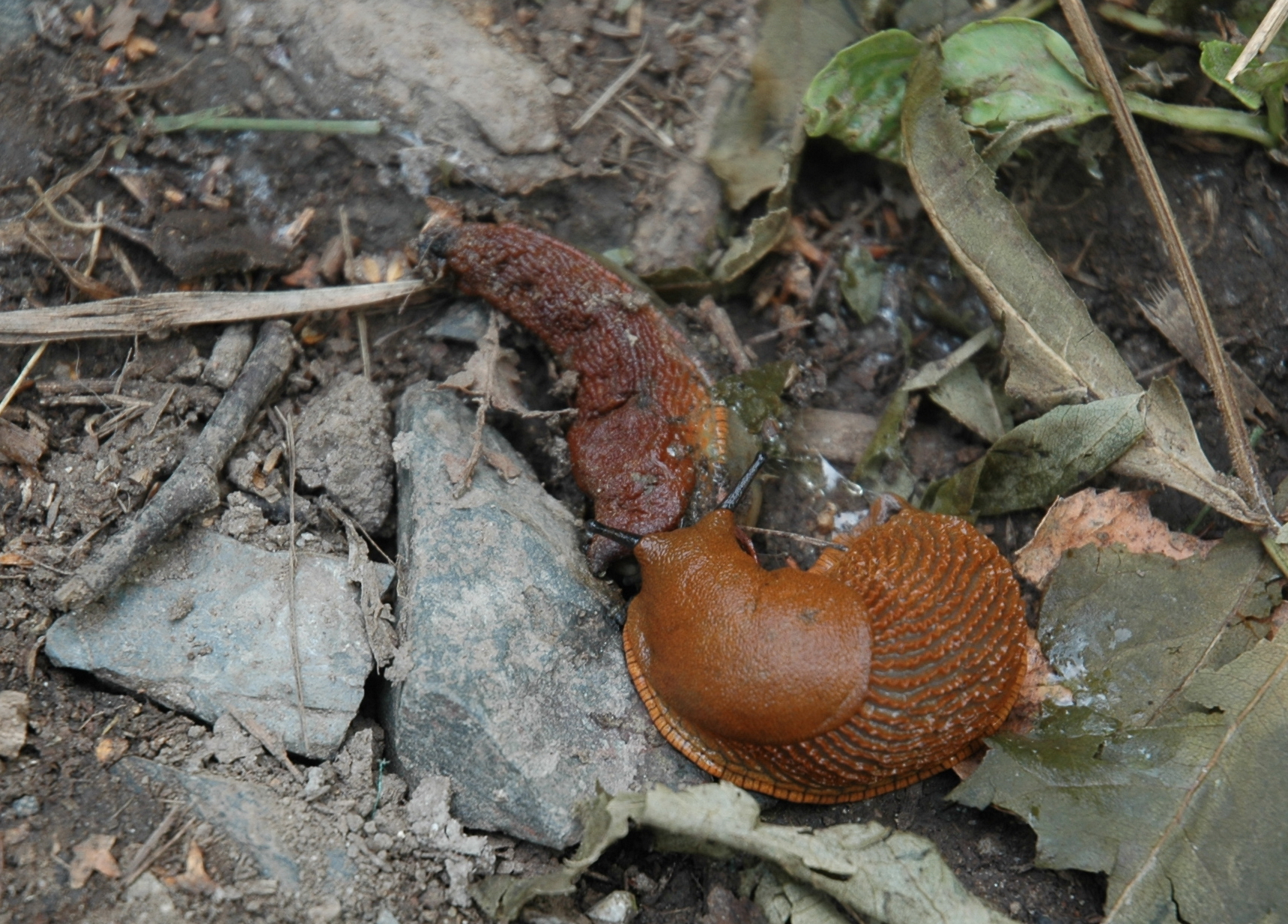
A Spanish slug eating a dead conspecific

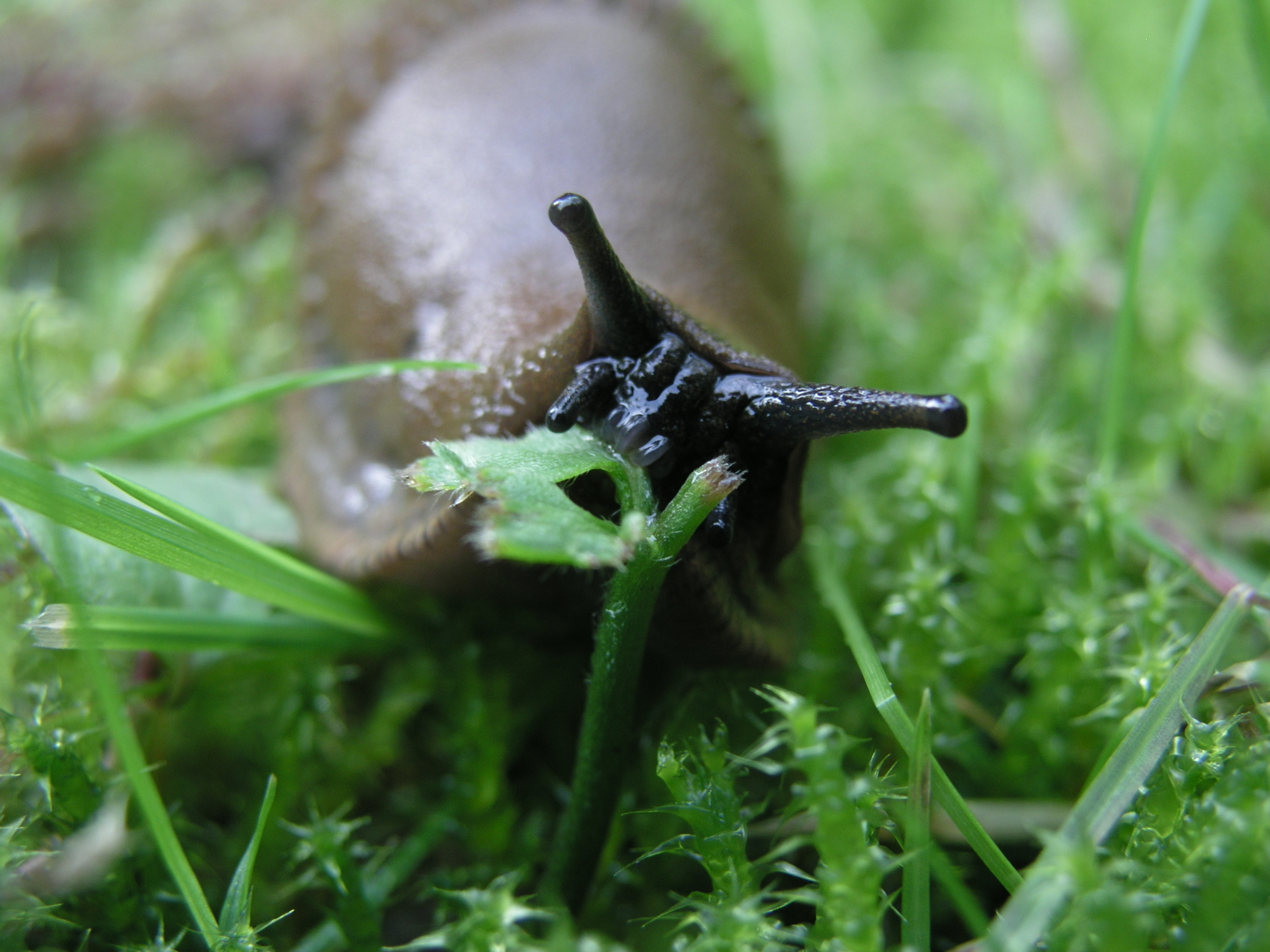
A Spanish slug eating clover

A Spanish slug eating a leaf

The habitat of Arion vulgaris includes all agricultural ecosystems, as well as natural environments such as river and lake margins, forest edges, forests in valleys or meadows. In Switzerland it has been found up to 1700 m in altitude.

It is a serious agricultural and horticultural pest in large parts of Europe, eating a cosmopolitan range of growing plant parts as well as decaying vegetation. Opportunistically it eats carrion, including squashed conspecifics. It is active mostly during the night and in wet weather during the day. Densities can reach 50 individuals per m^{2} or locally even higher.

Whilst a slug can crawl several metres within a night, long-distance dispersal is believed to be on vegetables, on horticultural seedlings, and on plant debris disposed of as waste.

The species has an annual life cycle with mating starting in July and eggs first laid some weeks later in late summer. Clutches are laid on the soil surface or in crevices up to 10 cm underground, with an average clutch size of about 70 eggs; an adult slug typically lays about 400 eggs in its lifetime. The eggs hatch from autumn to spring. Neither eggs nor slugs can survive temperatures below ―3 °C, so overwinter survival depends on hiding under shelters. Adults normally die off in autumn before winter frosts.

In the Czech Republic, population density varies considerably from year to year. This depends not on the coldness of the winters but on weather in spring and early summer: lack of rain and high soil temperatures reduce population density.

== As an invasive species ==
Arion vulgaris is considered among the 100 worst invasive species in Europe and this is the only land gastropod among them.. It is claimed to be the most important slug pest in Europe and has economic, ecological, and social impacts.

The local name of the slug in the regions it has invaded is typically a translation of "Spanish slug". In recent years, as its dominance has increased, it has been nicknamed "killer slug", perhaps due to its tendency to eat dead or weaker individuals of the species, although its destructive impact on gardens may seem just as appropriate a reason for the name.

Like other pulmonate snails and slugs, it is a hermaphrodite and this species has the capacity to self-fertilize, so that one single slug can start an infestation. Long-distance transport of produce and garden plants has been assumed to be a common means of its rapid dispersal.

Besides causing economic damage, the arrival of A. vulgaris has often been associated with the disappearance within a few years of the similarly sized congener Arion ater s.l., at least in synanthropic habitats. While the two species coexist they may mate with each other and produce fertile offspring. Hybrids are often identifiable by their intermediate genital anatomy. It has been proposed that in Scandinavia crossing of A. vulgaris and the indigenous A. ater ater might have produced a more frost-resistant variety. However, genetic investigations have not shown that introgression of A. ater genes into A. vulgaris persist for long once the native species has disappeared. In the Swiss Alps, Arion ater rufus persists only at high elevations, and hybrids with A. vulgaris occur in a contact zone along the altitudinal gradient.

Given the densities that A. vulgaris can attain, other ecological effects on the native flora and fauna are to be expected. For instance, the seeds that it consumes are less likely to survive to germinate than with other gastropods with which it was compared. In Sweden complete defoliation of native shrubs in natural woodland has been reported.
