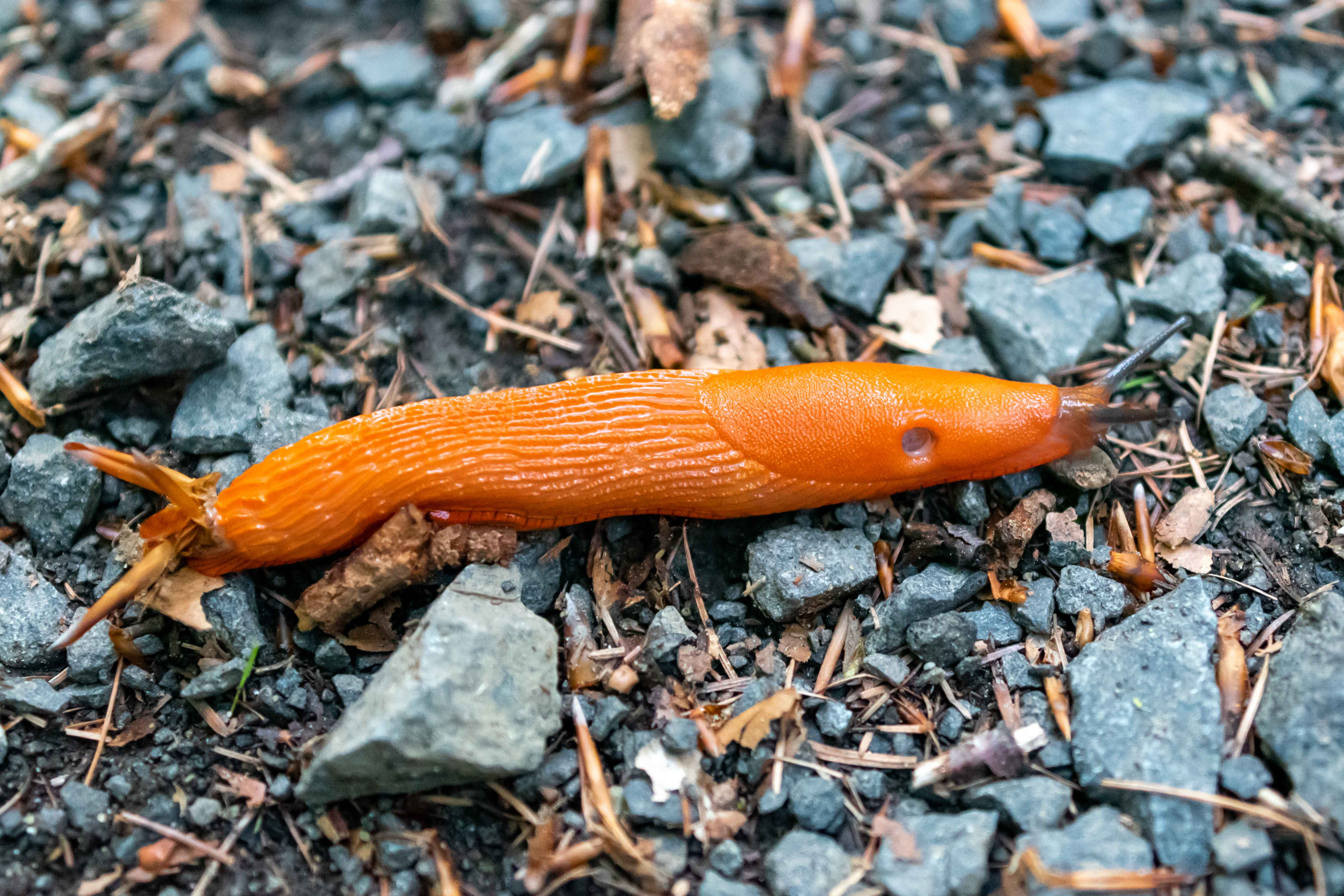

Conservation status
- Least Concern (IUCN 3.1)

- Apparently Secure (NatureServe)

Scientific classification
- Kingdom: Animalia
- Phylum: Mollusca
- Class: Gastropoda
- Order: Stylommatophora
- Family: Arionidae
- Genus: Arion
- Species: A. ater
- Subspecies: A. a. rufus

Trinomial name
- Arion ater rufus (Linnaeus, 1758)

Synonyms
- Arion (Arion) rufus (Linnaeus, 1758) superseded rank; Arion (Lochea) rufus (Linnaeus, 1758) superseded combination; Arion (Lochea) rufus var. miniaceus Mabille, 1871 junior subjective synonym; Arion rufus (Linnaeus, 1758) superseded rank; Arion rufus rufus (Linnaeus, 1758); Limax rufus Linnaeus, 1758 superseded combination

= Arion ater rufus =

Species of gastropod

Arion ater rufus, also known as the red slug, large red slug, chocolate arion and European red slug, is a subspecies of land slug in the family Arionidae, the roundback slugs.

== Description ==
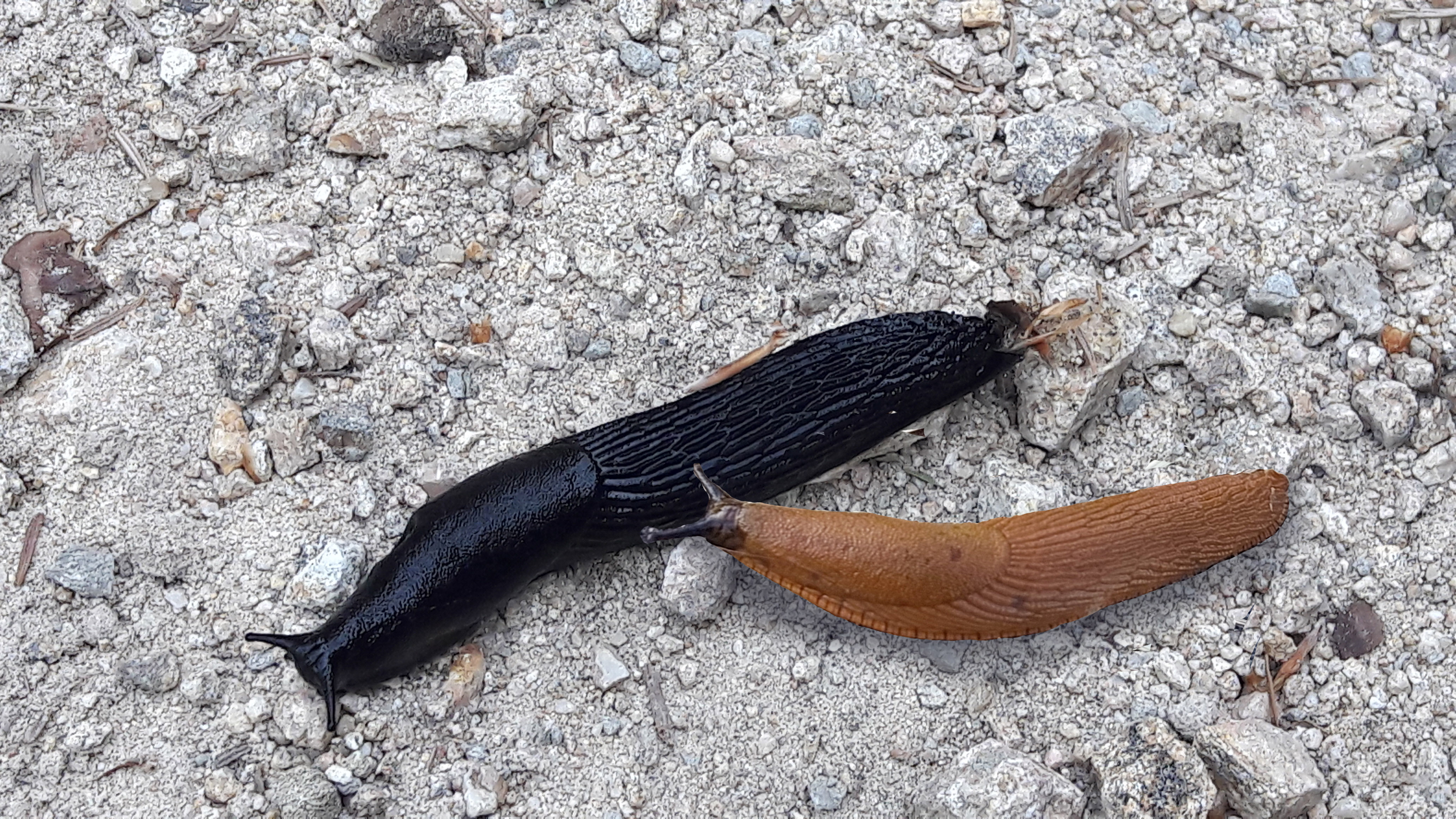
Black slug (Arion ater) and Red slug.

Slugs in the genus Arion have the pneumostome (respiratory pore) in the front part of the mantle and a round back without a keel. Arion ater rufus is one of the largest species in the genus, up to 150 mm extended. As an adult it lacks the lateral bands found in many smaller congeners, but in some forms the sides are paler than the back. The body colour is often reddish, sometimes vividly so, but orange, yellowish, brown and greyish forms are also usual, and some individuals may be black. The foot fringe is vertically striped and is often a different colour than the back. The head and tentacles are often darker than the rest of the body. The mucus is sticky and colourless or orange. Externally the species is not reliably distinguishable from several other species, including A. ater and A. vulgaris, and can be difficult to distinguish from less closely related species such as A. flagellus, especially in the Iberian Peninsula where further similar species exist.

Eggs are typically about 5 mm in diameter, slightly ovoid. They are opaque white, because of a calcareous layer in the shell. Juveniles often have lateral bands.

Adult A. ater rufus and A. ater are straightforward to distinguish from A. vulgaris and A. flagellus by dissection; in the former pair the oviduct is thinner because the ligula is positioned in the upper atrium, not the oviduct. The anatomical differences between A. ater rufus and A. ater are more subtle: the latter tends to have a larger lower atrium, and its ligula differs (e.g. bowl-shaped rather than C-shaped).

Arion ater rufus will often rock spectacularly from side to side when irritated, which is useful to distinguish it from A. flagellus and generally from A. vulgaris, but not from A. ater.

== Taxonomy ==
Linnaeus described A. ater rufus together with Arion ater in 1758. His description consisted mainly of references to earlier published descriptions from around Europe. Recently a lectotype for A. rufus has been designated from amongst the specimens to which Linnaeus indirectly referred. This is a non-surviving specimen amongst those that Martin Lister described from Almondbury in West Yorkshire, England.

Arion ater rufus can be externally indistinguishable from Arion ater. There are anatomical differences between the taxa in their genitalia, but they hybridise, and so they have often been considered conspecific, particularly by British authors. The appropriate name is then Arion ater rufus (i.e. a subspecies of A. ater), following the decision of Fleming ("the first reviser", in 1822) to give A. ater precedence over A. rufus.

Differences in mitochondrial DNA and minor anatomical differences exist between populations of A. rufus found in the British Isles and the commonest form found on the European continent. These have been given the status of species or subspecies. Because of the designation of the lectotype, the name rufus now refers to the British form, which may be called Arion ater rufus depending on which taxa are considered as species or subspecies. Garsault (1764) appears to have been the first to describe the Continental form under a name other than rufus, so its name should be Arion ruber, Arion rufus ruber or Arion ater ruber. Quite possibly there are further forms of similar status from elsewhere in France and Spain.

== Distribution ==
Arion ater rufus is widespread in western Europe, including France, the Low Countries, Germany, western Poland, Switzerland and the southern parts of the British Isles. In Scandinavia and northern Britain the closely related species A. ater occurs in its place, but A. rufus has invaded parts of Scandinavia over the last 200 years. It is also extending its range further eastward in Europe, and even in eastern Germany it is possibly an old introduction. Its status in Spain is uncertain because of the presence there of other similar species. Arion ater rufus is also known as an introduction in North America. A related form, reddish in coloration but perhaps more closely related to A. ater s.s., has recently turned up in Turkey, on both sides of the Bosphorus.

== Habitat ==
It is familiar from gardens and parks as well as disturbed agricultural landscapes, but also from a diversity of natural habitats including woodland, meadows, margins of water bodies, coastal habitat, and moorland. However, in much of its range A. rufus has declined dramatically over the last decades due to replacement by the externally similar Arion vulgaris.

== Life cycle ==
The species is adult in summer, although the timings vary by a month or so between localities. Typical would be for some individuals to reach adult size in May, but to mature only in July, with some surviving until October. The eggs hatch over a broad period from late autumn to spring and studies find great variation in growth rate. Adults are on average over 300 times the mass of hatchlings. The life cycle is predominantly annual; but possibly a few late hatchlings overwinter as juveniles and mature only 18 months or so after hatching.

== Behavior ==
At rest A. rufus contracts into a hemispherical shape. When disturbed, it performs a rocking motion, sometimes for many minutes. Although predominantly nocturnal, rain brings it out during daylight. It is an omnivore.

Arion ater rufus is hermaphrodite and during its mating spermatophores are swapped reciprocally. Mating typically starts with one slug following the other, periodically nibbling its tail. When the leading slug doubles back, they may form a wheel configuration circling clockwise, with each nibbling the other. This soon evolves into the yin-yang configuration (or the wheel step may be skipped), with each animal hooked around the other, their genital pores pressed together, the configuration no longer rotating. The genitalia take some minutes to engage and evert, the epiphallus (spermatophore producing organ) connecting to the bursa trunk of the other, mutually. This may take several attempts and sometimes is unsuccessful. Then the genital atria evert, and swell rapidly (1–2 min) to form a large, white, spherical mass between the bodies. The slugs remain like this for 90 minutes or longer, during which time a spermatophore is manufactured, filled with sperm, and in part passed over to the partner, hidden by the enveloping atria. Eventually one partner starts to become active, the configuration consequently rotates, the atria contract, and the genitalia separate. The spermatophores, anchored in the recipient's bursa trunk, are thereby pulled out of the donor's epiphallus. As the genitalia fully retract the spermatophore is taken in.

== Gallery ==
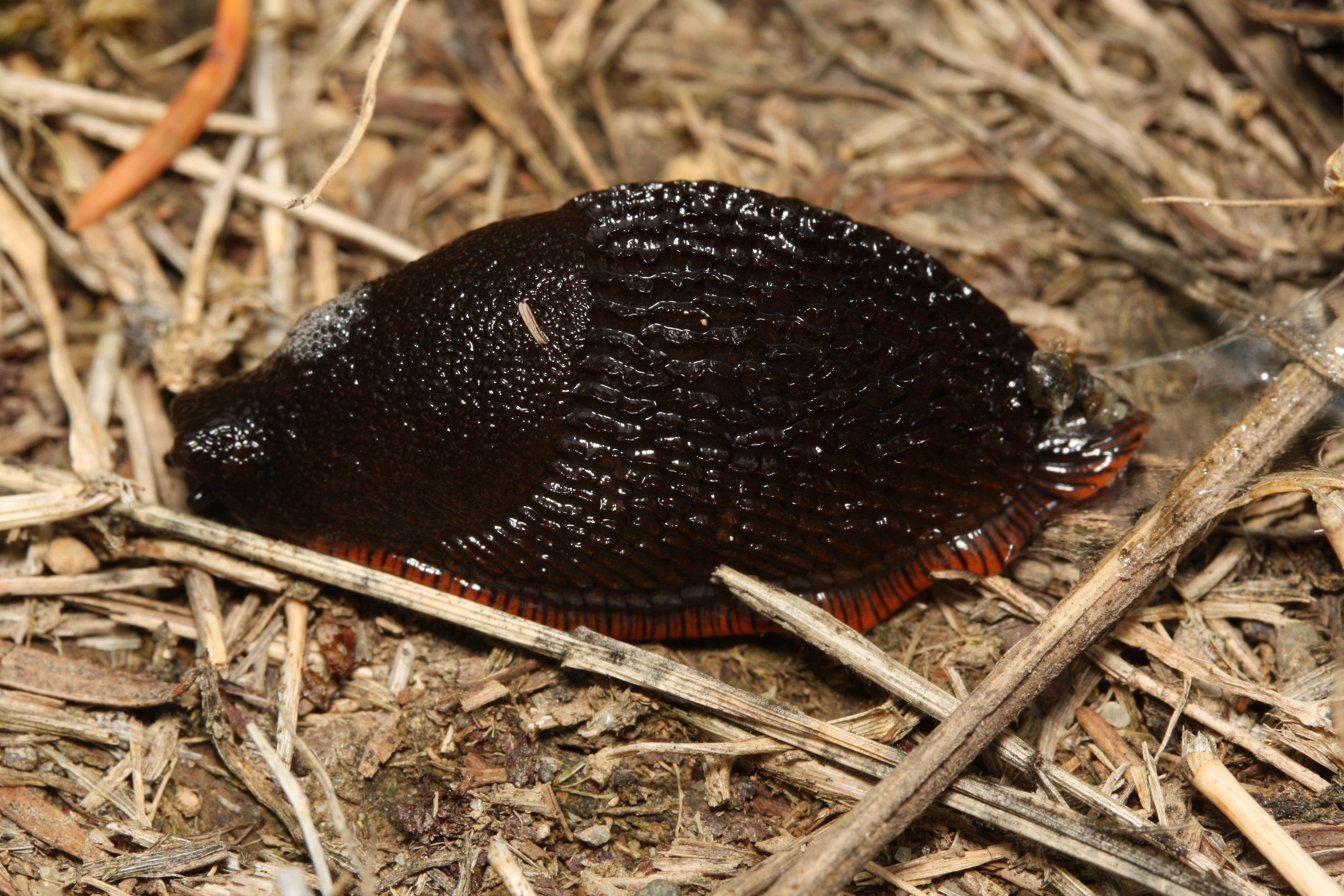
Dark individual

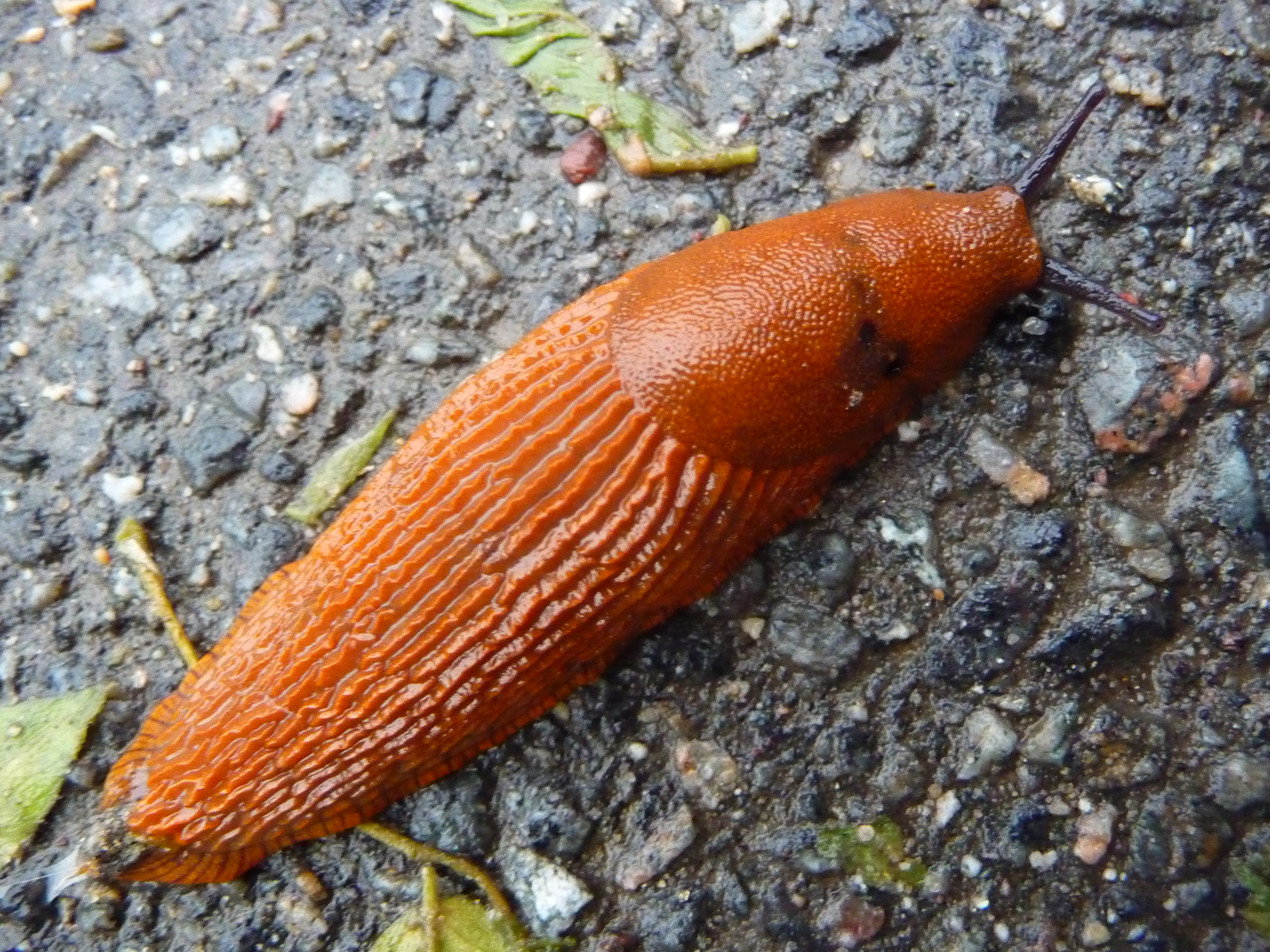
Light individual

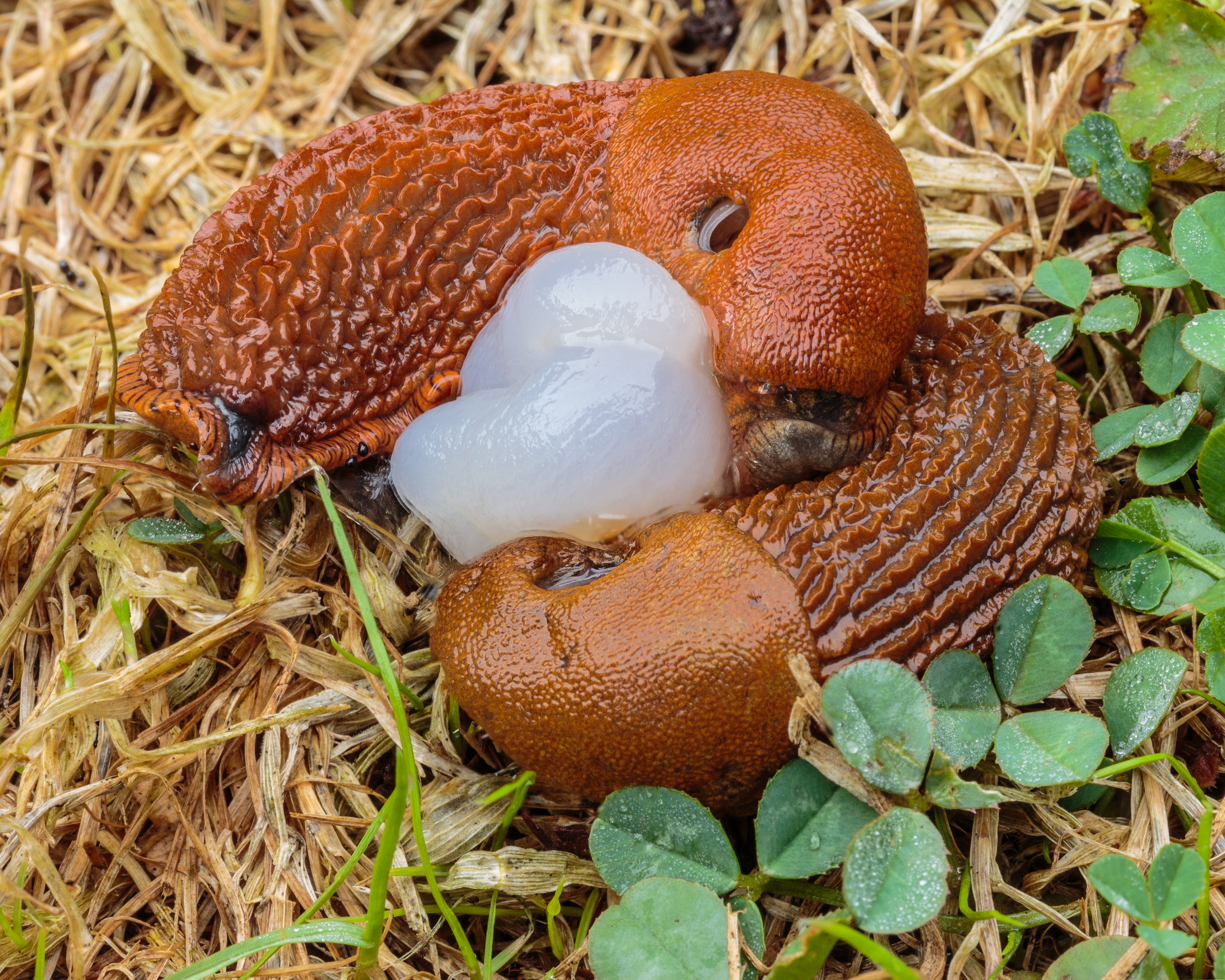
Copulation

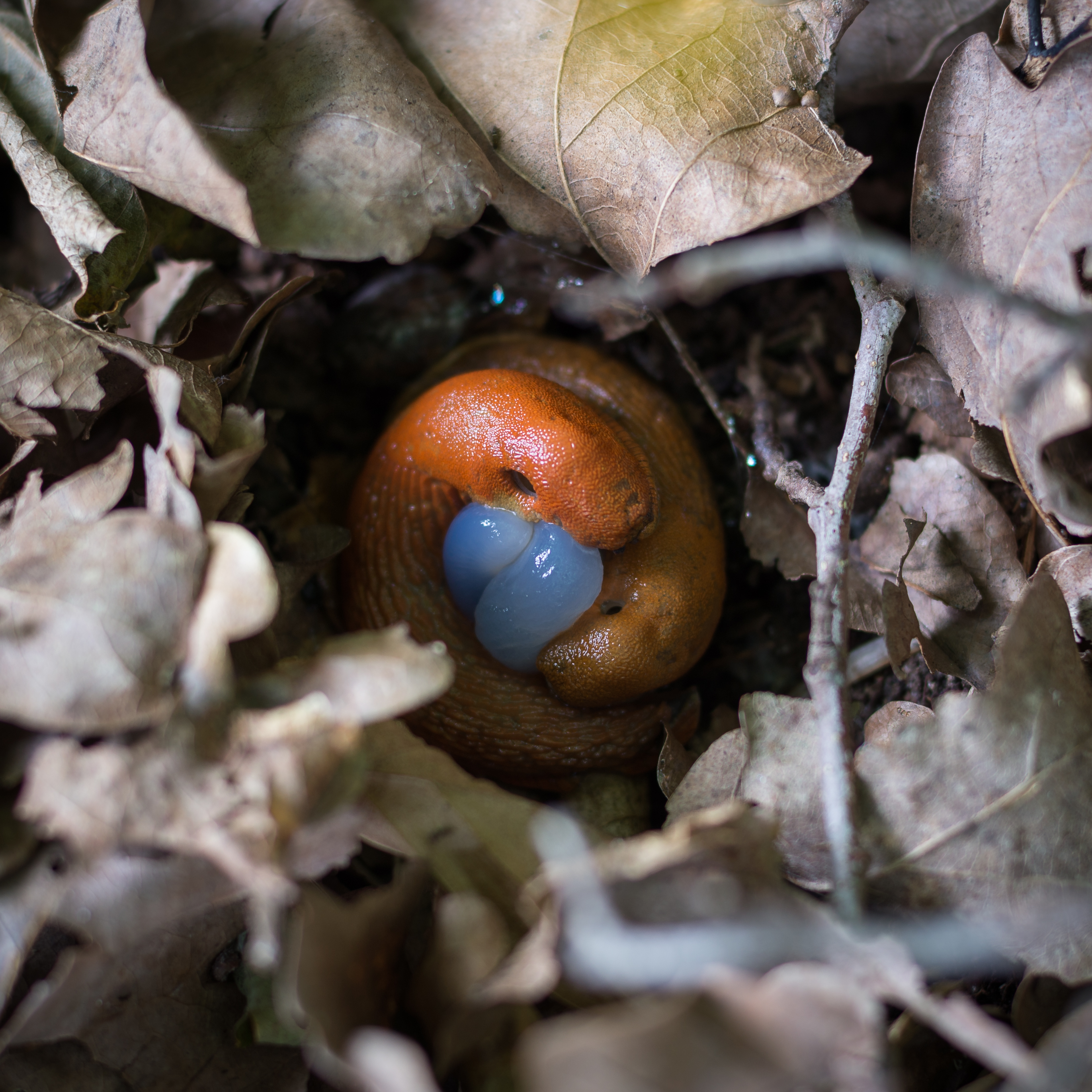
Mating
