= Anchicubaris =

Scientific classification
- Kingdom: Animalia
- Phylum: Arthropoda
- Class: Malacostraca
- Order: Isopoda
- Suborder: Oniscidea
- Family: Armadillidae
- Genus: Anchicubaris; Collinge, 1920

Genus of woodlice

Anchicubaris is a genus of woodlice belonging to the family Armadillidae. This genus was described in 1920 by Walter Edward Collinge. The type specimen for this species is an Anchicubaris fongosiensis from Mt. Fongosi, South Africa. There are currently three species in this genus.

== Description ==
Species of Anchicubaris have an oblong-oval, strongly convex body. The epimera (side plates) have thickened lateral ridges and are strongly curved posteriorly and outward; distally, they are produced upward and appear truncate dorsally and laterally. The cephalon has a flattened epistome, with a markedly expanded anterior margin. This genus does not have antennules. Their telson extends slightly beyond the uropods.

This genus has a bilobed caudal process of the seventh sternite in the male which covers and protects the genital papilla.

=== Remarks on similar genera ===
The genus Anchicubaris is morphologically similar to the genus Cubaris but is distinguished primarily by the distinctive shape of its mesosomal pleural plates and the pronounced anterior projection of the cephalon.

== Distribution ==
Anchicubaris isopods have been found in South Africa, Zimbabwe, and in Equatorial Guinea on Annobón island.

== Species ==
- Anchicubaris annobonensis Schmalfuss & Ferrara, 1983
- Anchicubaris fongosiensis Collinge, 1920
- Anchicubaris scoriformis Collinge, 1945

=== Species formerly included in this genus ===
- Anchicubaris demiclavula Lewis, 1998 = Stigmops demiclavula (Lewis, 1998)
- Anchicubaris howensis Lewis, 1998 = Stigmops howensis (Lewis, 1998)
- Anchicubaris luteus Budde-Lund, 1908 = Pyrgoniscus luteus (Budde-Lund, 1908)
- Anchicubaris spinosus Collinge, 1942 = Barnardillo barnardi (Collinge, 1920)
