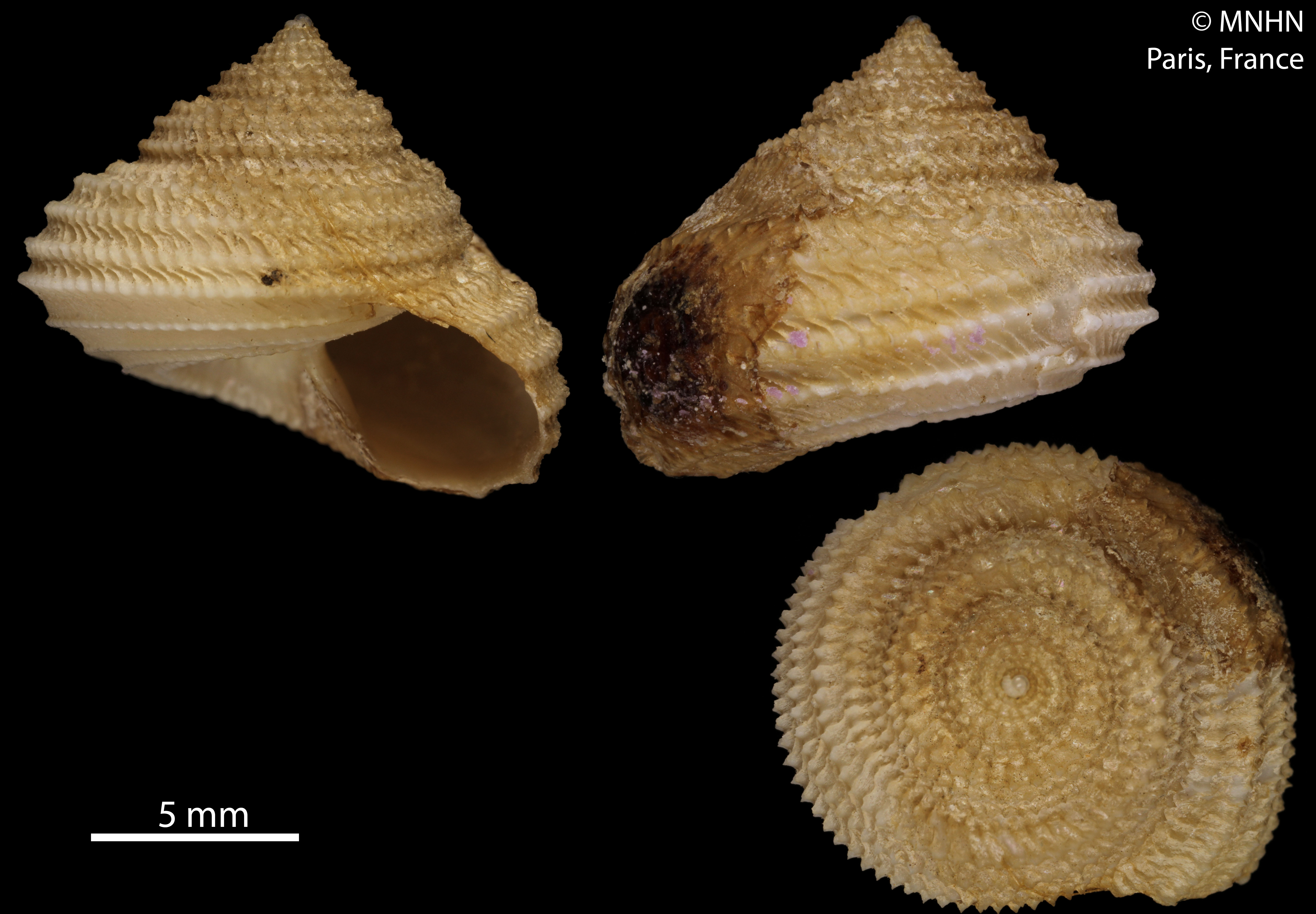
- Shell of Calliotropis blacki (specimen at MNHN, Paris)

Scientific classification
- Kingdom: Animalia
- Phylum: Mollusca
- Class: Gastropoda
- Subclass: Vetigastropoda
- Family: Calliotropidae
- Genus: Calliotropis
- Species: C. blacki

Binomial name
- Calliotropis blacki Marshall, 1979

Synonyms
- Calliotropis (Calliotropis) blacki Marshall, 1979 (original combination)

= Calliotropis blacki =

Species of gastropod

Calliotropis blacki is a species of sea snail, a marine gastropod mollusk in the family Eucyclidae.

== Description ==
The length of the shell reaches 33 mm and is usually the bigger type of snails rather than the regular black snail

== Distribution ==
This marine species occurs off the Kermadec Islands and New Caledonia.
