= Pneumostome =

Breathing pore in gastropods

Arion vulgaris opening its pneumostome

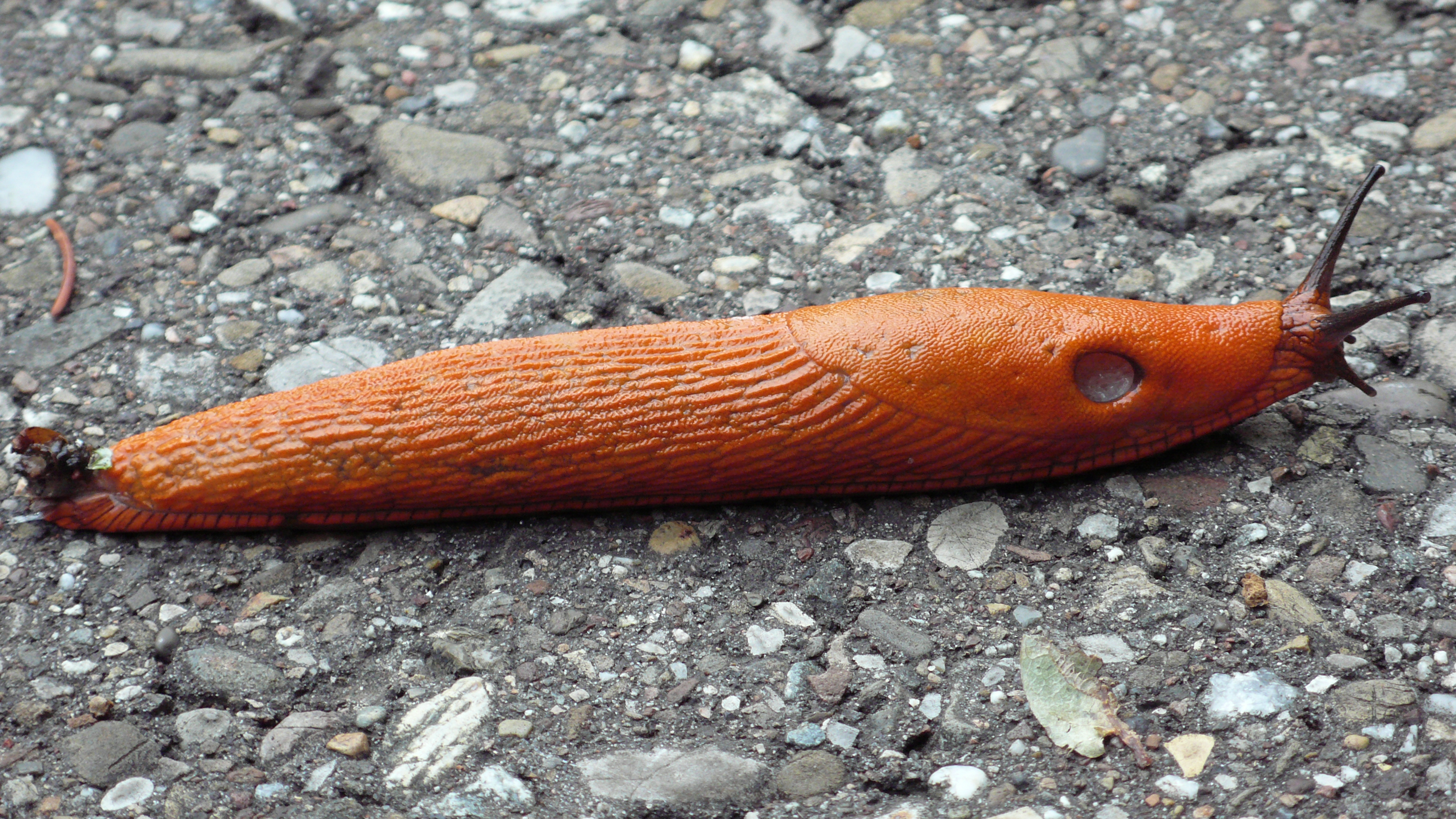
An individual Arion rufus with the pneumostome wide open

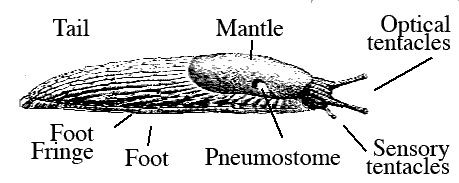
Drawing showing the different external anatomical features of a slug

Open and closed pneumostome

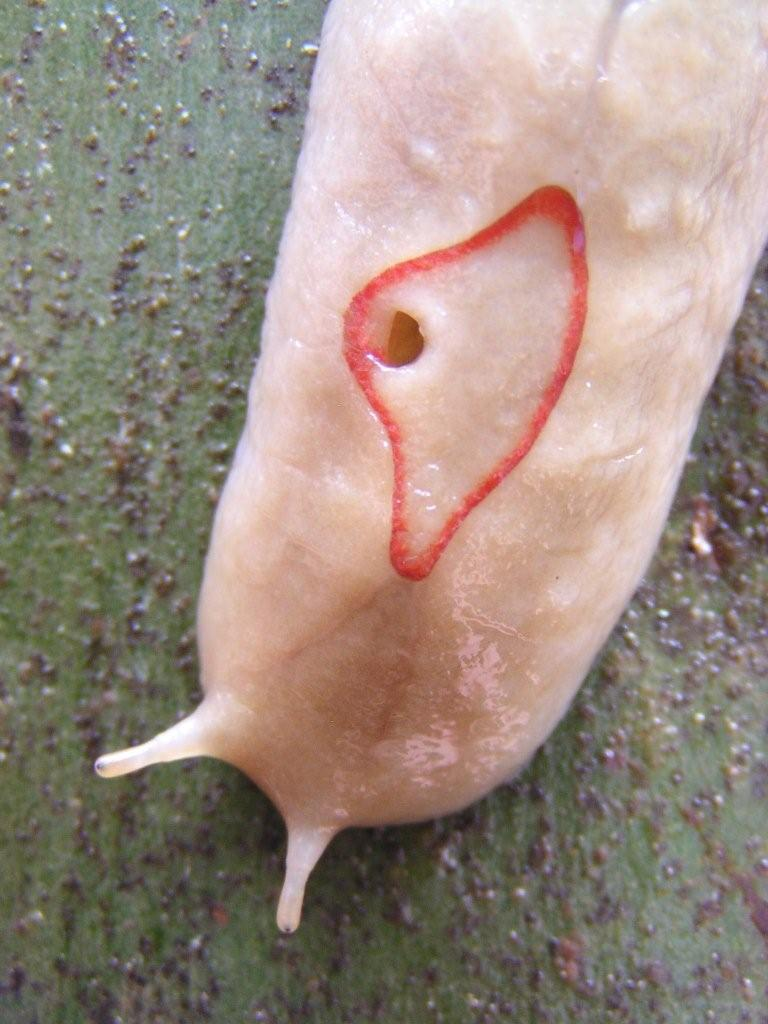
The pneumostome of Triboniophorus graeffei is on its dorsal surface.

The pneumostome or breathing pore is a respiratory opening of the external body anatomy of a pulmonate land slug or land snail. It is a part of the respiratory system of gastropods.

It is an opening in the right side of the mantle of a stylommatophoran snail or slug. Air enters through the pneumostome into the animal's single lung, the air-filled mantle cavity. Inside the mantle cavity the animal has a highly vascularized area of tissue that functions as a lung.

The pneumostome is often much easier to see in slugs than in snails, because of the absence of a shell which can often block the view of this area. In a land slug, when the pneumostome is wide open, it is usually very clearly visible on the right side of the animal. However, the position of the pneumostome is often not at all easy to discern when this orifice is completely closed.

The pneumostome opens and closes in a cyclical manner. The frequency of pneumostome closing and opening is typically less than 0.5 closures per minute in fully hydrated slugs and snails. The rate of closures per minute increases the more dehydrated the slug is.

== Position of pneumostome as a diagnostic feature ==
The images in the gallery below show the position of the pneumostome in three different families of slugs:

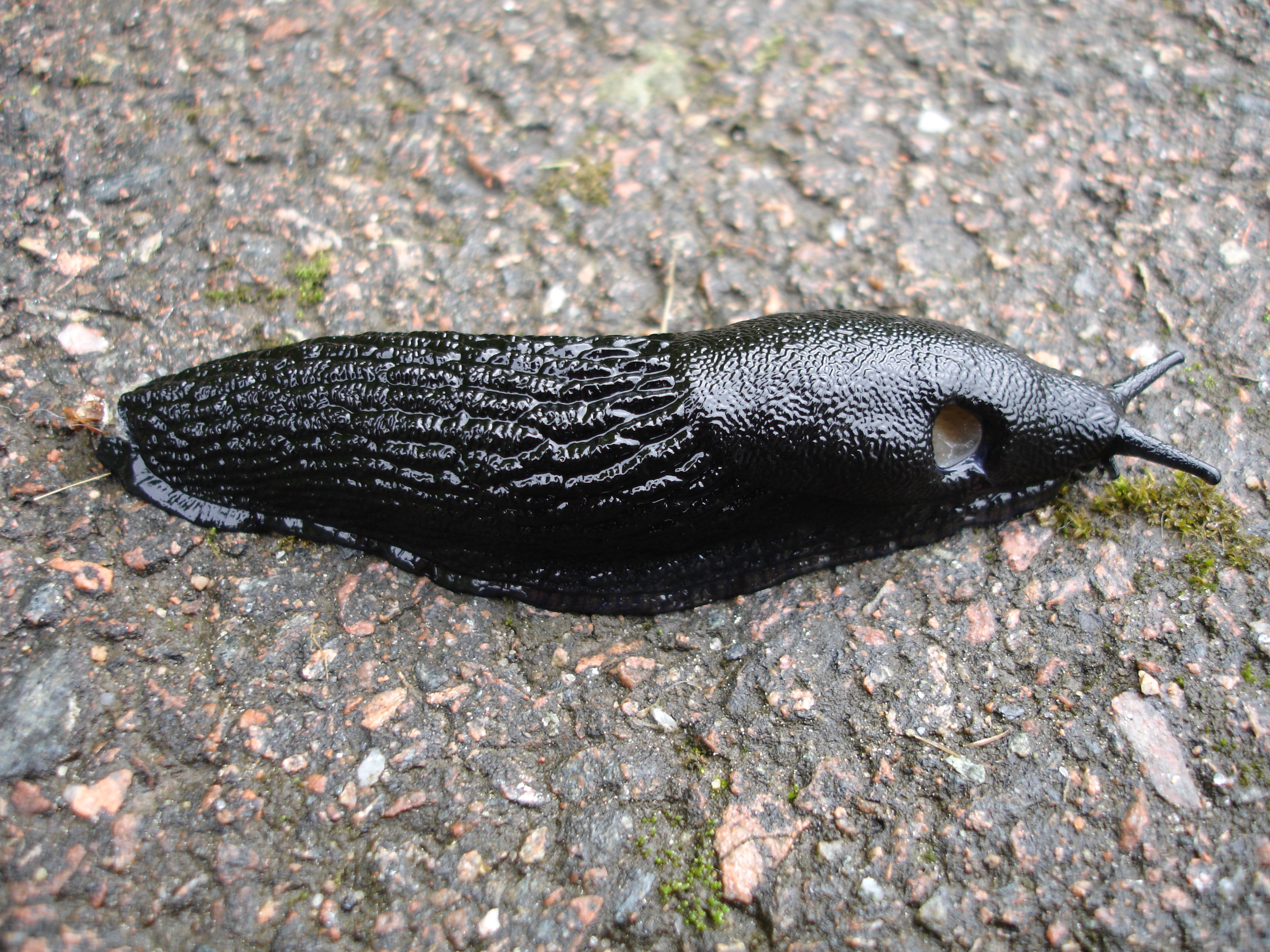
Arionidae (Arion ater), the pneumostome is just anterior to the midpoint of the mantle

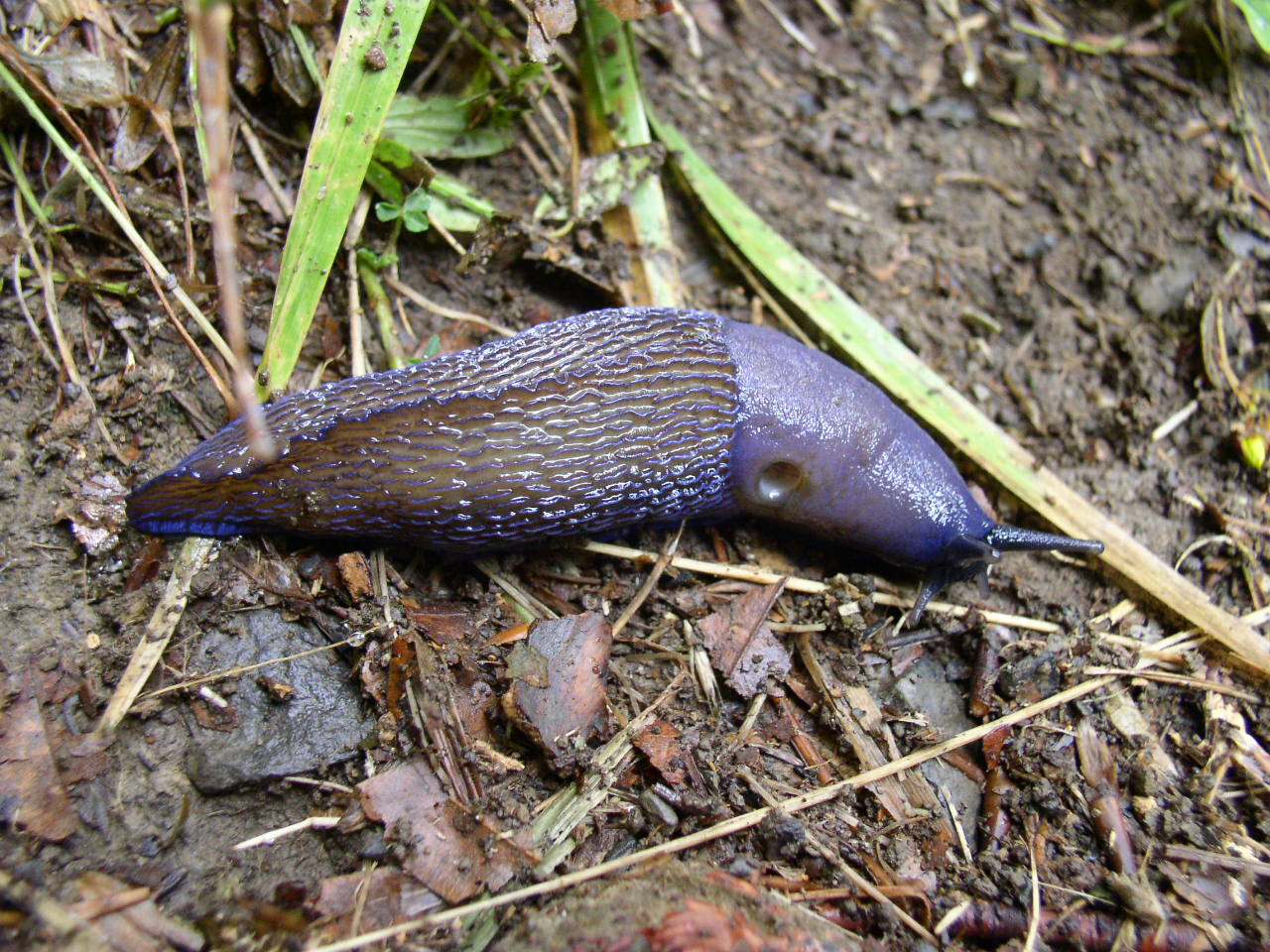
Limacidae (Bielzia coerulans), the pneumostome is just posterior to the midpoint of the mantle

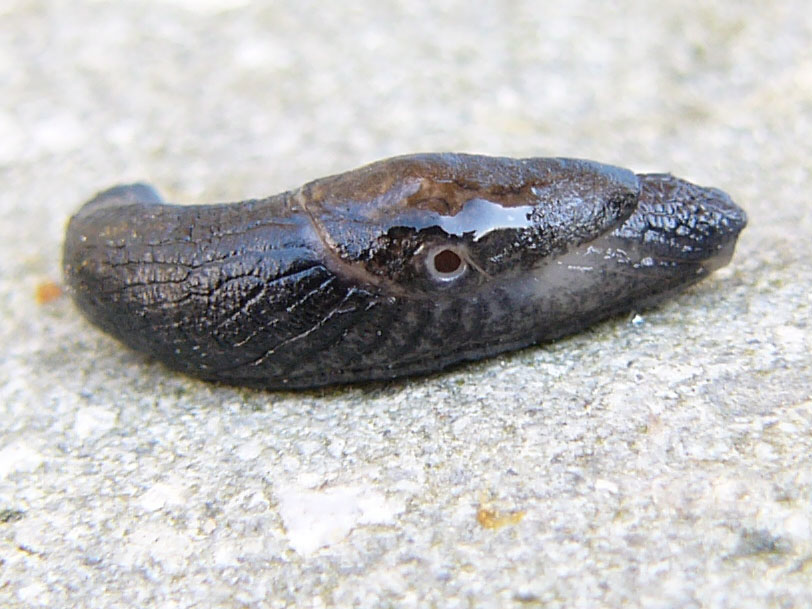
Milacidae (Tandonia budapestensis), the pneumostome is just posterior to the midpoint of the mantle
