= Walter Edward Collinge =

British zoologist and museum curator

Dr. Walter Edward Collinge FSA FES FLS
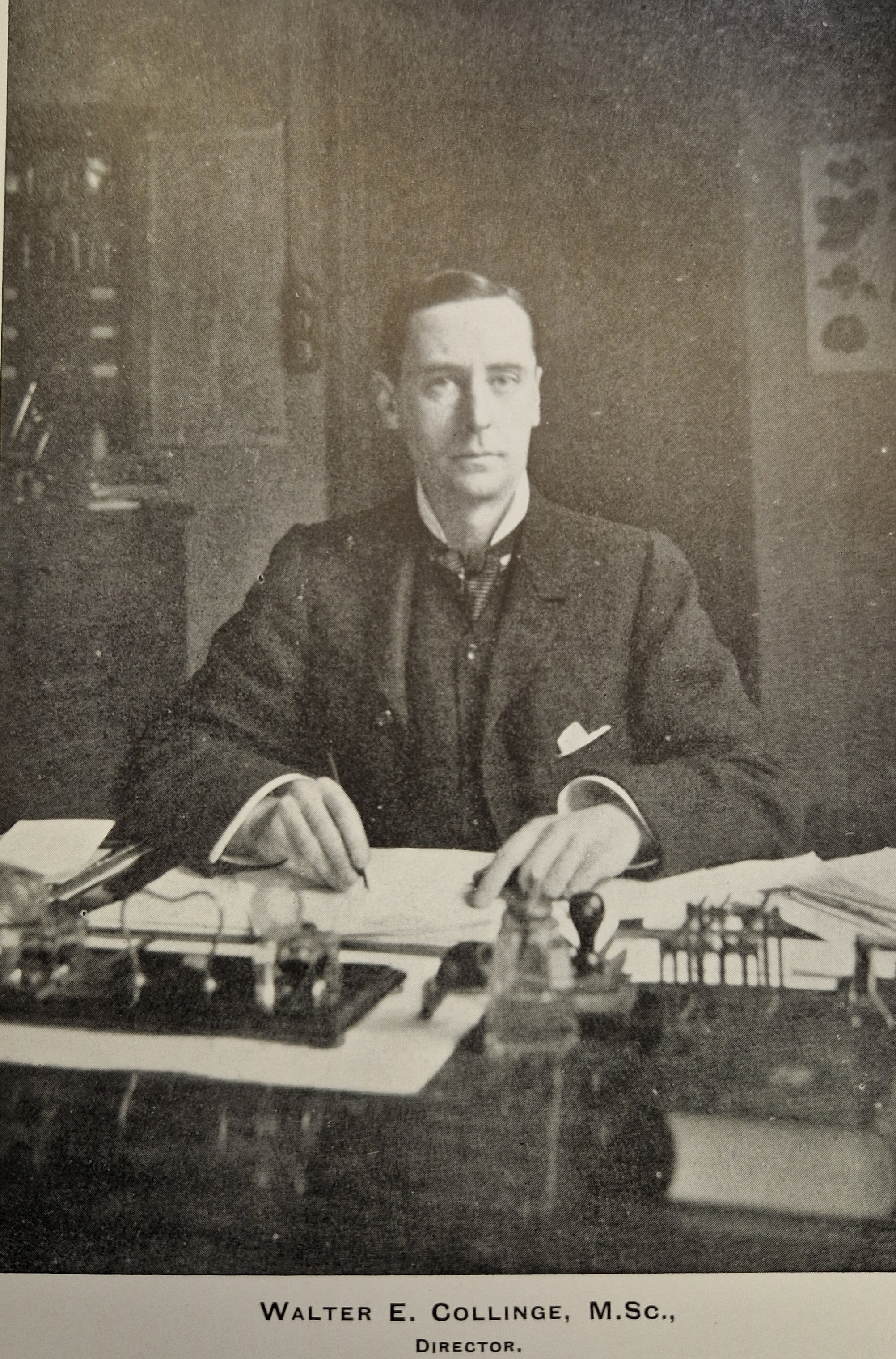
- Collinge at the Cooper Research Laboratory in 1909
- Born: 19 April 1867; Huddersfield, England
- Died: 24 November 1947 (aged 80); York, England
- Occupations: Zoologist; Museum curator

Academic background
- Education: University of St Andrews

Academic work
- Discipline: Zoology
- Sub-discipline: Isopoda; Ornithology
- Institutions: University of St. Andrews; Birmingham University; Yorkshire Museum

Walter Edward Collinge FSA FES FLS (19 April 1867–24 November 1947) was a British zoologist and museum curator. He is notable for his academic work on terrestrial slugs and Isopoda and on economic biology.

== Early life and education ==
Collinge was born in Huddersfield. He undertook his first degree at Leeds University before becoming a demonstrator in zoology at the University of St Andrews in 1891.

== Career ==
Collinge was a lecturer in zoology and comparative anatomy at Birmingham University when it was founded in 1900. He was director of the Cooper Research Laboratory and edited the first volume of its journal in 1909. From 1915–1919 he returned to St. Andrew's as the Carnegie Research Fellow at the Gatty Marine Laboratory. He became Keeper of the Yorkshire Museum in March 1921 and stayed in this post until his retirement in March 1941. During his tenure at the Yorkshire Museum, Collinge devoted much of his academic attention to the economic aspects of ornithology.

Collinge was a member of many learned societies. He was a member of the British Numismatic Society, a 'foreign member' of the American Association of Economic Entomologists, Honorary Fellow of the Royal Horticultural Society, joint secretary of the Association of Economic Biologists, and a member of the British Ornithologists' Union. He was a fellow of the Royal Entomological Society, the Linnean Society and the Society of Antiquaries of London, and had served as president of the Conchological Society of Great Britain and Ireland.

=== Binominal authority ===
Collinge identified several species as new to science,^{Note 1} including Arion flagellus, Cryptosemelus gracilis, and Microparmarion pollonerai.

Two species are named in honour of Collinge, Clanculus collingei and Streptaxis collingei.

== Publications ==
- Collinge, W. E. 1893. "Description of the anatomy &c. of a new species and variety of Arion", Annals and Magazine of Natural History (6) 12 (70). 252-254.
- Collinge, W. E. 1896 The Skull of the Dog: A Manual for Students with a Glossary of Osteological Terms. London.
- Collinge, W. E. 1902. "On the non-operculate land and fresh-water molluscs collected by the members of the "Skeat expedition" in the Malay Peninsula, 1899-1900", Journal of Malacology 9(3).
- Collinge, W. E. 1908. Report on the injurious insects and other animals observed in the Midland counties during 1904-07. Birmingham, Cornish bros.
- Collinge, W. E. 1912. Second report on economic biology. Birmingham, The Midland Educational.
- Collinge, W. E. 1913. The Food of some British Wild Birds: A Study in Economic Ornithology. London.
- Collinge, W. E. 1915. "Description of a new Genus and Species of Terrestrial Isopoda from British Guiana", Zoological Journal of the Linnean Society 32 (220), 509–511 doi:10.1111/j.1096-3642.1915.tb01872.x
- Collinge, W. E. 1917. "On the oral appendages of certain species of marine Isopoda". Zoological Journal of the Linnean Society, Zoology, 34. 65–92.
- Collinge, W. E. 1934. "On a Roman Phalera Found near Malton". Proceedings of the Yorkshire Philosophical Society (1934). 3–4.
- Collinge, W. E. 1935. "On Some Spoon-shaped Fibulae in the Yorkshire Museum and Elsewhere". Proceedings of the Yorkshire Philosophical Society (1935). 1–4.
- Collinge, W. E. 1935. "On a Roman memorial stone in the Yorkshire Museum. Proceedings of the Yorkshire Philosophical Society (1935). 5-6.
- Collinge, W. E. 1935. "Woodlice, their Folk-Lore and Local Names", The North-Western Naturalist 10. 19–21.

== Note ==
1. A full list of the described species of molluscs by Collinge is here.
