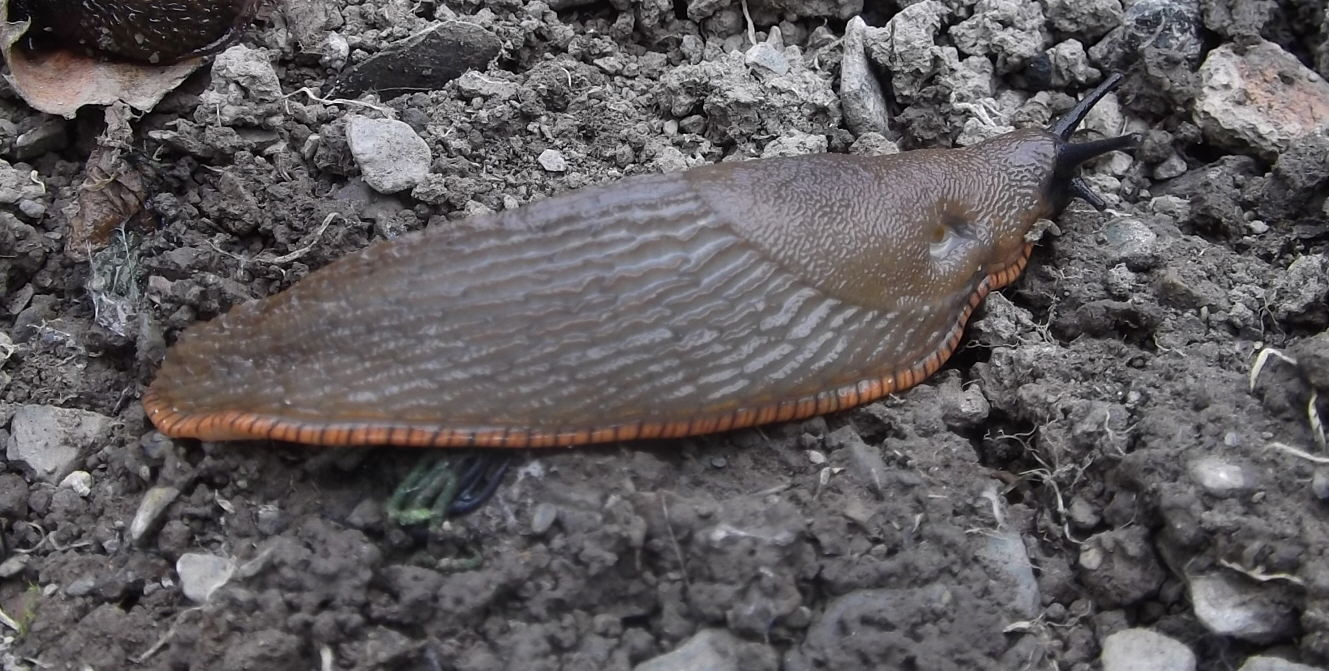
- A live and active individual of Arion ater

Conservation status
- Least Concern (IUCN 3.1)

- Secure (NatureServe)

Scientific classification
- Kingdom: Animalia
- Phylum: Mollusca
- Class: Gastropoda
- Order: Stylommatophora
- Family: Arionidae
- Genus: Arion
- Species: A. ater

Binomial name
- Arion ater (Linnaeus, 1758)

Synonyms
- Arion (Arion) ater (Linnaeus, 1758) alternative representation; Arion ater var. albida Roebuck, 1883 (junior synonym); Arion ater var. albolateralis Roebuck, 1883 (suspected synonym); Arion ater var. empiricorum A. Férussac, 1819 junior subjective synonym; Arion empiricorum A. Férussac, 1819 junior subjective synonym; Arion sulcatus Morelet, 1845 junior subjective synonym; Limax ater Linnaeus, 1758 (original name)

= Arion ater =

Species of gastropod

Arion ater, the black slug (also known as black arion, European black slug, or large black slug), is a large terrestrial gastropod mollusk in the family Arionidae, the round back slugs.

Many land slugs lack external shells, having a vestigial shell. Most slugs retain a remnant of their shell, which is usually internalized, unlike other terrestrial mollusks (such as snails) which have external shells. Without such shells, slugs produce mucus—that may also contain toxins—to deter predators. Terrestrial slugs produce two other forms of mucus that facilitate locomotion and prevent death from drying. Such mollusks are hermaphroditic. Slugs most often function as decomposers but are also often omnivores. Arion ater is one such slug, decomposing organic matter, preying on other organisms, and consuming vegetative matter including agricultural crops. Native to Europe, the black slug is an invasive species in Australia, Canada (British Columbia, Newfoundland, Quebec), and the United States (Pacific Northwest, Alaska).

== Subspecies ==
- Arion ater ater (Linnaeus, 1758)
- Arion ater ruber (Garsault, 1764)
- Arion ater rufus (Linnaeus, 1758)

== Description ==
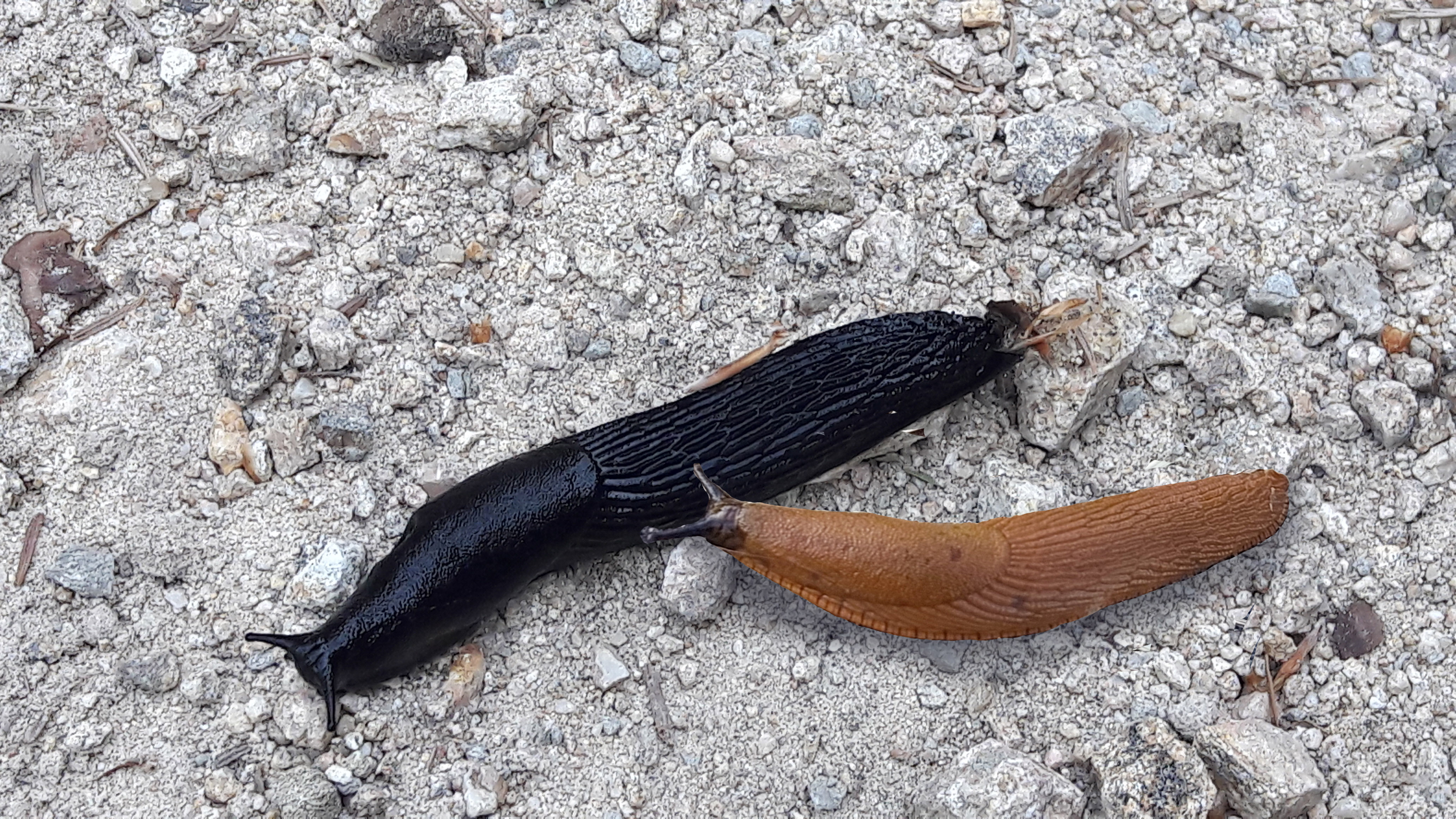
Black slug and Red slug (Arion rufus).

Arion ater varies from 10–15 cm (3.9–5.9 in), reaching maturity at about 2.5 cm (0.98 in) and moves at a speed of up to 4.5 cm/min (1.8 in/min)

The black slug is generally deep black, with some adults being brown or even white. Generally, pigmentation darkens directly with increasing latitude. Young specimens tend to be brown or ivory whitish, turning to grey before becoming characteristically black at maturity. Rust-brown individuals are arguably classified as a separate subspecies Arion ater rufus or species Arion rufus (red slug). The two can only be distinguished by dissecting the reproductive anatomy.

The foot-fringe is black, the tubercles are large and elongate, and the sole is blackish grey. The atrium and vagina (genitalia) are considerably narrower than is the spermatheca (organ for storing sperm). The oviduct is narrow while the spermatheca is spherical.

The black slug is omnivorous, and its diet includes fungi, carrion, earthworms, leaves, stems, dead plant material and dung. The food is shredded into tiny pieces by the radula and is then digested by enzymes.

Like other terrestrial slugs, the black slug is a hermaphrodite, preferring to find a mate—often several—but can self-fertilize. After mating, the black slug seeks a dark, moist environment such as beneath mosses—occasionally within topsoil—to lay its eggs about 5 mm (0.20 in) in diameter. Between August and October, an individual slug lays up to 150 eggs every one to three weeks—clutches diminishing to 20 eggs late in the season. Juveniles hatch after at least twenty-seven days, hatching later under cold temperatures. Maturation takes up to nine months, enabling mating in early summer. Black slugs die shortly after laying its last clutch, rarely surviving into a second year.

The ovotestis (gonad or hermaphrodite gland) produces gametes at the proximal end of the reproductive system. The hermaphrodite duct runs forward, connecting to the albumen gland and the common duct (spermoviduct). The male and female gametes separate before entering the common duct. The male portion of the reproductive tract contains the vas deferens and the epiphallus. Arion slugs lack a penis. The vas deferens connects the spermoviduct to the epiphallus. The epiphallus then opens to the genital atrium. The spermathecal duct (bursa copulatrix duct) is a sac for storing spermatozoa and also enters the atrium. The female portion contains the oviduct, transferring eggs from the common duct to the atrium. The atrium is further subdivided into an upper and lower atrium. A stimulating organ (ligula) can also be found in the atrium. Finally, the atrium opens through the genital pore. The genital pore is located on the animal slightly behind and below the right upper tentacle on the head.

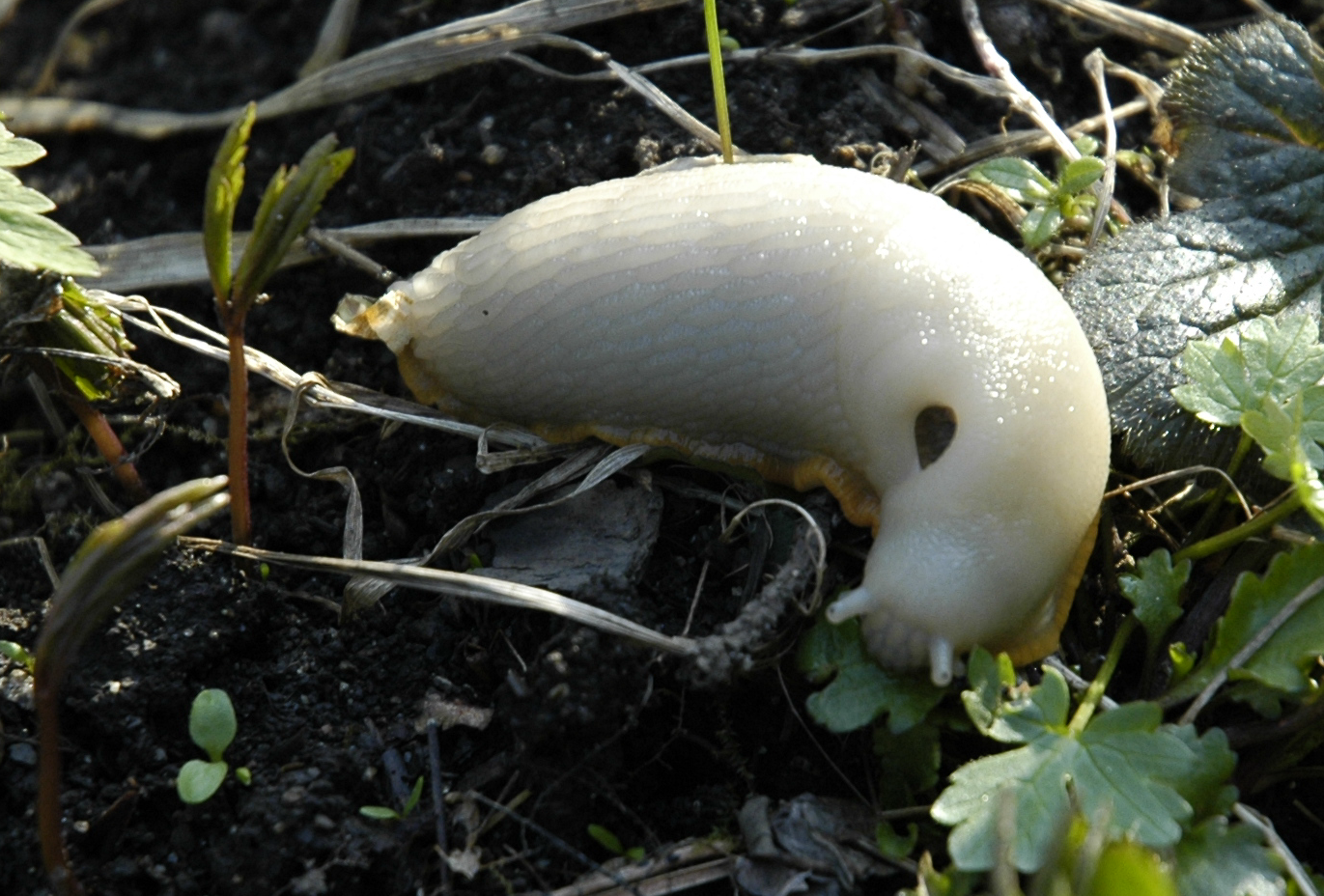
Albino of the black slug Arion ater

Like other members of the family Arionidae, the black slug has a pneumostome (breathing hole) on the right side of its mantle through which it breathes. This mantle is the part in snails that secretes a shell, but in the black slug, the mantle contains a resilient protective structure of calcareous granules.

Arion ater produces three forms of mucus. The first two aid the animal in locomotion, with a thinner mucus coating the animal laterally, and a thicker, more viscous mucus secreted along the length of the slug. This combination facilitates wave like contractions of the foot that propel the animal forward. The third type of mucus is a vile-tasting substance which helps deter predation. All three forms of mucus help protect the slug from dehydration, as well as to locate and identify other slugs to mate with, or even prey upon.

== Distribution ==
This species is found in northern Europe (including Great Britain and Ireland), Canada, the Pacific Northwest, and most recently in Australia and some Caribbean countries:

- Great Britain: often found in habitats more wooded and less human-dense than those in which A. ater rufus occurs
- Maladeta Mountains, Spain: often an agricultural pest
- Ireland, Italy, Germany, Scandinavia, and Gerês, Portugal
- Canada [invasive]: first document in 1941, established pest by 1960
  - British Columbia
  - Newfoundland
  - Quebec (specifically on Mont Bellevue in Sherbrooke)
- United States [invasive]: Within its native habitats, this species functions as a decomposer/consumer and often becomes an agricultural pest. This species is well-established in Washington and Oregon, and it is considered to represent a potentially serious threat as a pest, an invasive species which could negatively affect agriculture, natural ecosystems, human health or commerce. Therefore, it has been suggested that this species be given top national quarantine significance in the USA.
- Australia [invasive]: The Museum Victoria reports the black slug to have been first documented in Australia in 2001 with multiple reports of these slugs in cultivated gardens and farms since, but as of 2009, the species was still not considered to be an established species in Australia.

== Ecology ==
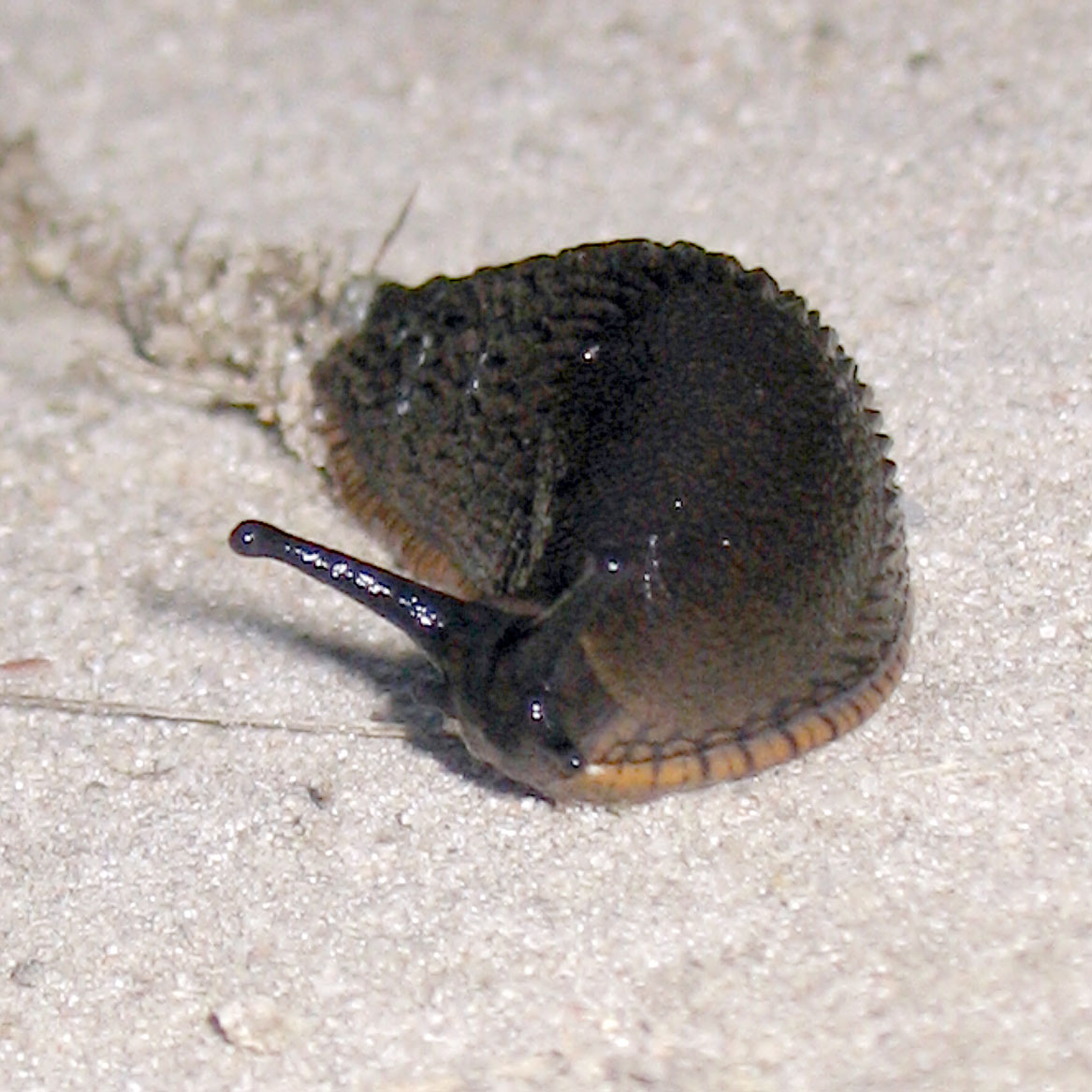
A black slug on the move.

Black slug in Northern Poland displaying defensive swaying.

The black slug is mainly nocturnal and avoids exposure to sunlight, although in introduced areas, it has been observed to be active all parts of the day and night. It is omnivorous, eating carrion, fungi, animal feces, algae, lichen, and vegetation (living or decaying). These slugs prefer to eat on cloudy days or at night when temperatures are above 10 degrees Celsius. Mucus-production necessitates moist habitats, such as among leaf-litter, mosses, or fallen trees. Consequently, the black slug becomes most active after rainfall. A 1976 study compared black slug assimilation rates to that of similar slugs in the UK. The study determined the black slug feeds at similar rates to other European slugs (in terms of biomass), suggesting the black slug is an equally important decomposer/consumer in forest systems. The study theorized these high assimilation rates might result from abundant enzymes in slug digestive systems: amylase, invertase, cellulase, xylanase, and chitinase. The last might be especially indicative of how these slugs can consume large quantities of fungi such as Armillaria mellea. Microbiota within black slug digestive systems produce these enzymes—such as the bacteria that produce cellulase—enabling the slugs to break down lignocellulose. A recent study further explored Arion ater’s gut microbiome and discovered the black slug to have far more bacteria within its gut than did neighboring, northern European insects, including members of the orders Coleoptera, Isoptera, Orthoptera, and Diptera. This study learned the black slug’s gut microbiome to be functional at a wide range of temperatures and pH levels, and its results suggest that the mycobacterial culture may be uniform throughout the black slug’s gut and that Gammaproteobacteria composes most of this culture. This study contrasted its results to studies of North American black slugs that presented higher levels of cellulolytic activity at a narrower pH range. In summary, Arion ater can digest diverse food material such as cellulose because gut bacteria produce digestive enzymes.

As decomposers/consumers, slugs engage an important niche, contributing to ecosystem health. A 2005 study looked at another Arion slug species and concluded slugs may promote plant biodiversity. This study suggested that slugs promote plant—especially forb—species diversity and that slugs support annual plant species’ fitness, reducing rates of successional change. Additionally, slugs help disperse seeds and spores through their waste, and slugs facilitate nutrient cycling by being an omnivorous consumer (especially a decomposer) and by leaving behind their mucus, which also facilitates decomposition.

Slugs are common agricultural and horticultural pests. They consume abundant vegetative matter, especially seedlings.

Most animals prefer not to prey upon the black slugs because of the taste of its mucus and because this mucus can make them slippery and consequently difficult to capture; however, this slug does have some natural predators, including the hedgehog, badger, shrew, mole, mouse, frog, toad, snake, carnivorous beetle, and some birds. When picked up or touched, the black slug will contract to a hemispherical shape and begin to rock from side to side. This defensive behavior confuses predators, and is unique in the family Arionidae.

== Invasive species ==
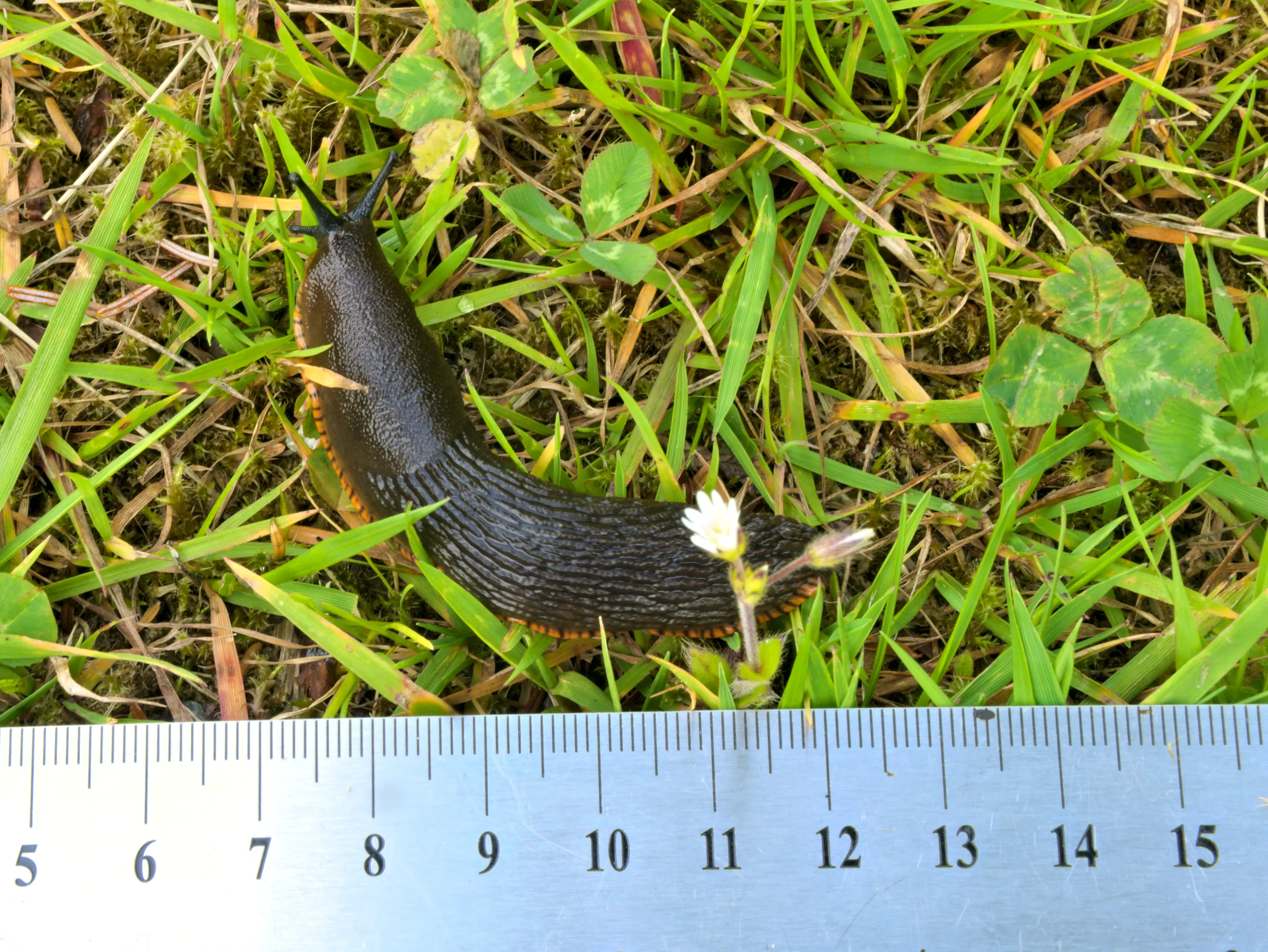
Invasive black slug in northern British Columbia

Arion ater has been introduced to southeastern Australia and to North America, where it occurs in Newfoundland, British Columbia, the Pacific Northwest of the United States and some parts of Alaska. In the past two decades, its mating with the non-native (at northern latitudes) pest species Arion vulgaris (or Spanish slug) has resulted in a more resilient hybrid exhibiting increased tolerance to cold.

These slugs might endanger sensitive ecosystems, especially as an invasive species, and it is yet unclear how drastically these slugs might alter plant community compositions. The black slug is a voracious seedling predator. Terrestrial slugs are considered to be especially dangerous because they alter plant species abundance, adult plant fecundity, and the production of plant defensive compounds. Black slugs are of special concern in fragmented ecosystems and areas with high shrub and tree cover. In Alaska, the black slug threatens seedling populations of lilies and orchids after already having diminished sensitive populations of deltoid balsamroot and yellow montane violet in BC Canada.

There is much debate concerning black slug effect upon plant species diversity. Slug impacts change over successional stages, and Alaska conservationists observed the black slug's impact on species diversity depends upon community composition. If a system is composed of sensitive species, the black slug will likely have a negative impact by pressuring said species. If a system presents more evenness with less sensitive species, the black slug may promote species diversity and encourage healthy succession rates.

Around the 1970s, the black slug came to Alaska via nursery plants, potting soil, or among shipments containing wood pallets. The Alaska National Heritage Project published an invasive ranking for the black slug, providing a recent case study of the species as an invasive. They ranked the species based upon distribution, biological characteristics, ecological impacts, and feasibility of control. These categories were assigned points, and Arion ater received a 62/100, awarding it a qualitative score of “moderately invasive.” This report stated the black slug can often be found in disturbed soils or areas with well-irrigated soils such as lawns. Frequent sightings along roads suggest the black slug might move more easily along human traffic corridors; however, the black slug is believed to migrate little during its one-year life span. Arion ater’s biology awarded it its highest risk factor. Again, the black slug is a prolific, omnivorous consumer, capable of inhabiting a wide range of conditions with high fecundity. Its effect upon local ecology received a moderate score; while the black slug puts pressure on native systems, it does not appear to catalyze entire regime shifts within the habitats where it has invaded. Greatest concern appears to be its possible pressure on early successional plants and native slugs. The black slug often feeds upon seedlings, diminishing plants’ reproductive success, but the black slug does not appear to be feeding selectively, endangering one plant species over another. And the black slug's effect on native-Alaska slugs is unknown, but the black slug might be displacing the banana slug in BC, Canada; however, such displacement might not have implications beyond those for the banana slugs. Slugs facilitate seed and spore dispersal through fecal matter. The black slug facilitates nutrient cycling by decomposing decaying and fecal matter; additionally, slug mucus left behind in the soil helps cycle nutrients, and Arion ater may merely step into this niche in place of native slugs. Arion ater has spread in Alaska in the following places: Anchorage, Cordova, Yakutat, Gustavus, Juneau, Sitka, Tenakee Springs, Ketchikan, and Kodiak Island, and in some of these areas, the black slug threatens lilies and orchids. It is unlikely complete removal can be achieved given high fecundity, but fencing and educating the public to hand pick black slugs might mitigate associated invasion risks.

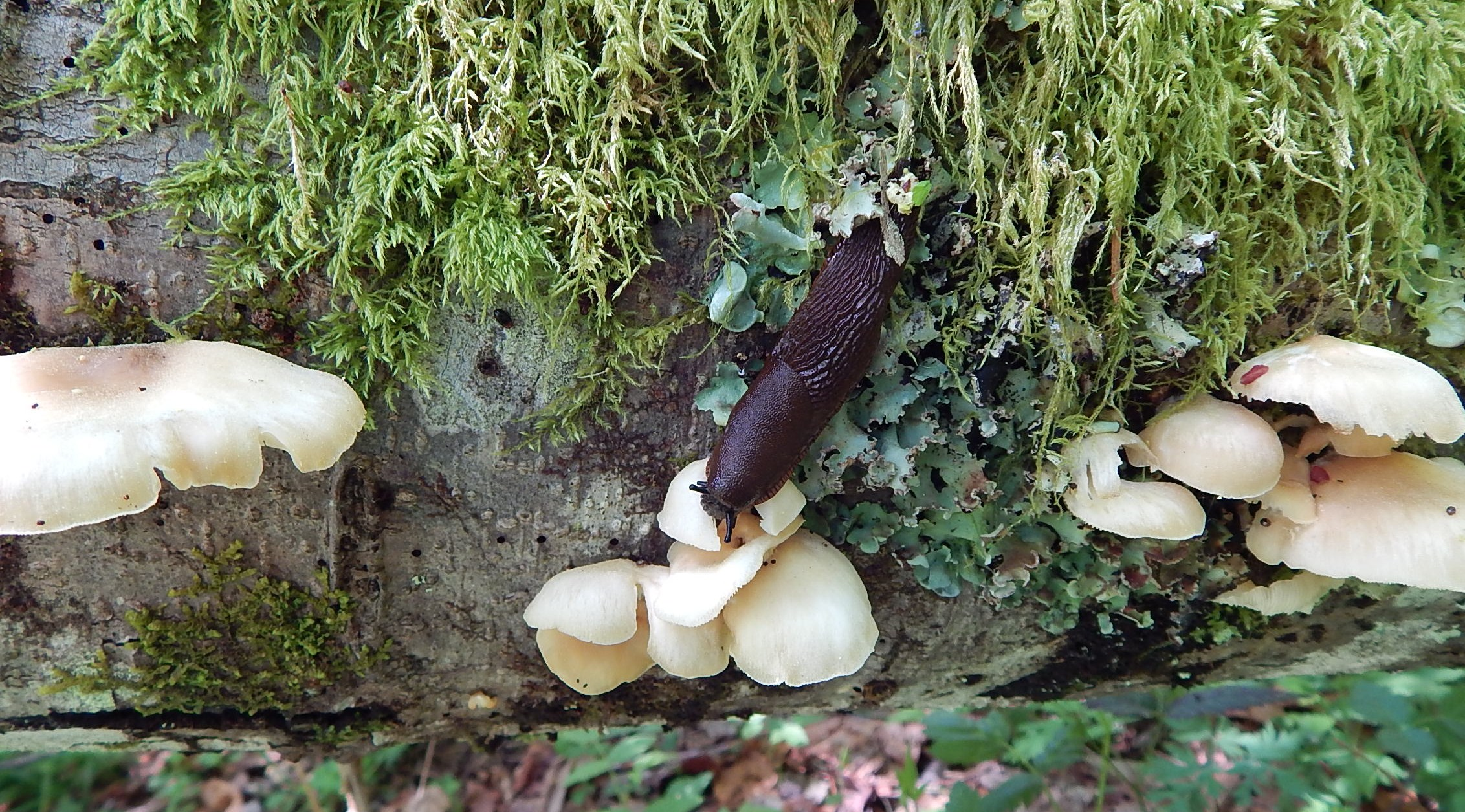
Arion ater eating fungi

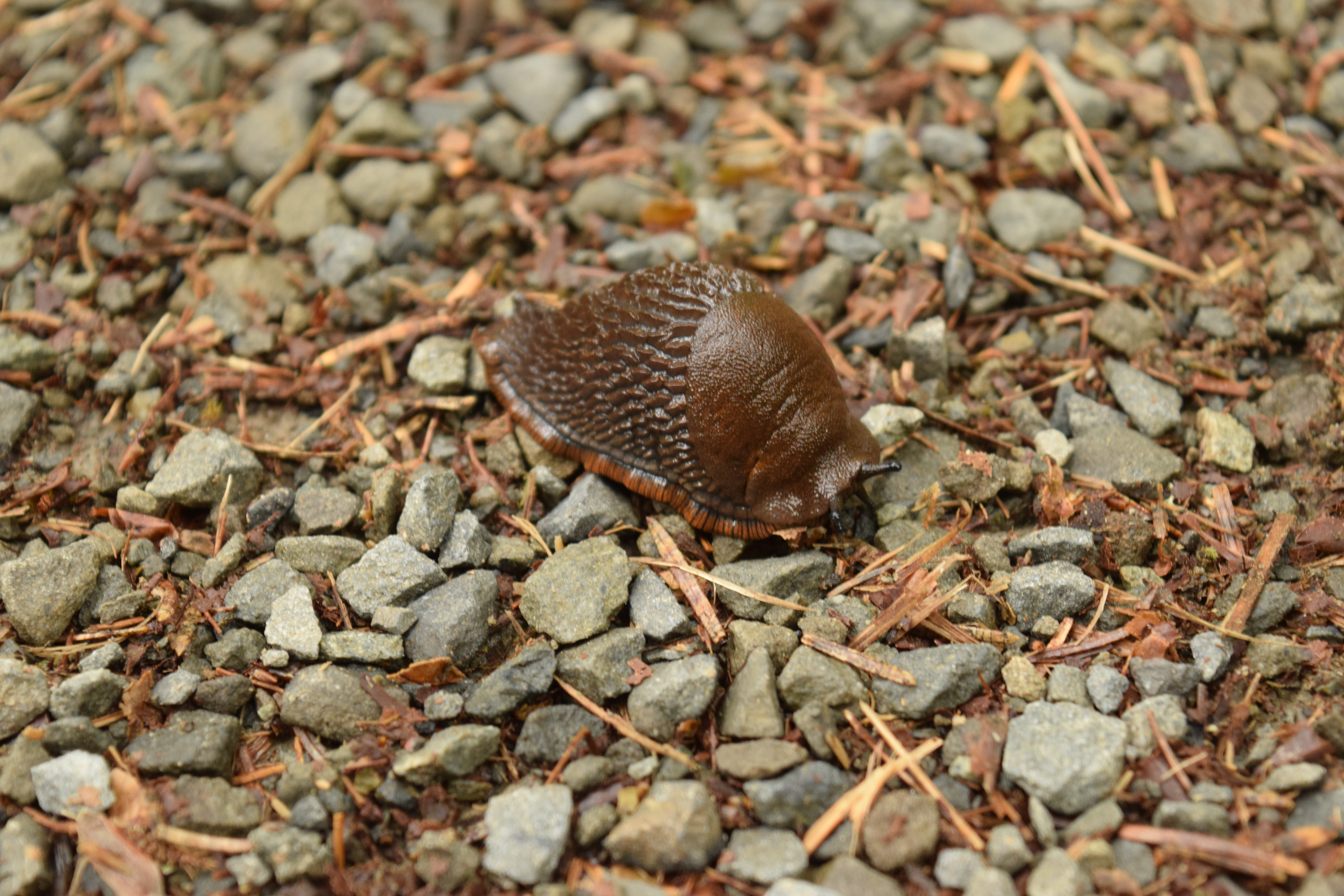
Invasive Arion ater in the Hoh Rainforest of Olympic National Park

Conservationists within the Pacific Northwest and BC Canada are concerned about competition between Arion ater and native slugs such as the banana slug (Ariolimax californicus, A. columbianus, and A. dolichophallus). The University of British Columbia's zoology department published a study on this interaction in 2015. They determined the two slugs to be functionally different but proposed further studies to determine whether black slugs are displacing native slugs. Their study found black slugs were more abundant and consumed a greater quantity of mushrooms than native banana slugs but could not determine reasons for differences in population sizes. They theorized the greater abundance of black slugs could be because the black slug displaced banana slugs or because the black slug might be invading areas with previously low banana slug numbers; however, there is no data for banana slug population sizes prior to the arrival of Arion ater. This complicates determining whether alien slugs have a negative or negligible effect upon native slug numbers. Additionally, this study could not determine whether high fungi-consumption resulted from dietary preference or from higher concentrations of alien slugs amidst Douglas fir forests, which promote fungal growth. The study also concluded that black and banana slugs compete for under-story berries. The study demonstrated neither native nor alien slugs consume conifer or fern seedlings. It also demonstrated no significant difference between metabolic rates. However, they concluded the black slug may eat more because of its shorter life span (one compared to several years), requiring faster consumption rates to reach sexual maturity. The study demonstrated both slugs benefit ecosystems by dispersing seeds and spores. This study demonstrates the two slugs to be functionally different; however, this study proposed further research on the following to determine if black slugs are displacing banana slugs: interactions between Arion ater and fungal communities and comparative studies looking at seed dispersal rates to determine their effect on native, fruit-bearing plant communities.

== Control strategies ==
The Garry Oak Ecosystem Recovery Team suggests the following control strategies, stating chemical controls should only be used as a last resort in protecting endangered species or critical habitat. Hand collecting is most effective at dusk or dawn when slugs feed most actively. Traps are also effective. Commercial traps can be used, or homemade traps can be made using beer. Fences can be used to protect small areas and can be commercial (often electrical) or easily homemade with sawdust, crushed eggshells, ground oyster shells, soap, cinders, or diatomaceous earth. Such fences are especially effective at protecting important seedlings or home gardens. European nematodes (Phasmarhabditis hermaphrodita) parasitize slugs, and in European agriculture, these nematodes have been mass-produced as a biological control; however, European nematodes are neither native to North America nor commercially available. In addition to nematodes, there may be other biological control methods. Sciomyzids (marsh flies) larvae kill slugs and live in environments similar to slugs. Additionally, carabid beetles consume slug eggs. Large carabid beetles, such as Abax parallelepipedus predate slugs.

The slug mite, Riccardoella limacum, is known to parasitize several dozen species of mollusks, including many slugs, such as Agriolimax agrestis, Arianta arbustrum, Arion ater, Arion hortensis, Limax maximus, Milax budapestensis, Milax gagates, and Milax sowerbyi. Any use of beneficial organisms presents risks of new invaders or of disrupting native population dynamics. Again, conservation groups like the GOERT view chemical treatments as an effective last resort. For example, metaldehyde baits are very effective, but such baits are toxic to humans and native slugs. Iron phosphate baits are less toxic than metaldehyde and carbonyl baits. Iron phosphate, however, degrades rapidly and must be reapplied regularly.

Alaska conservations (as previously mentioned) believe widespread watch programs to be crucial. By informing the public and by funding conservation efforts, we might be able to slow the spread of invasive slugs, preventing any possible competition between native and invasive slugs and protecting sensitive species from seedling predation.

== Human use ==
Arion ater was used as grease to lubricate wooden axle-trees or carts in Sweden. This use is documented since at least the 18th century. Black slugs are edible but rarely consumed by humans; they taste horrible, may bioaccumulate pesticides, and potentially carry French heartworm (Angiostrongylus vasorum) to carnivores including dogs.

Researching the black slug has provided human and ecological value. For example, a 1996 study investigated the bioaccumulation of mercury in black slugs and determined these slugs could be used to monitor levels of heavy metals in terrestrial systems—similar to how ecologists use aquatic mollusks. And a 2014 study researched the black slug gut's microbiology in hopes of catalyzing other studies of cellulolytic activity that could improve biofuel technology.
