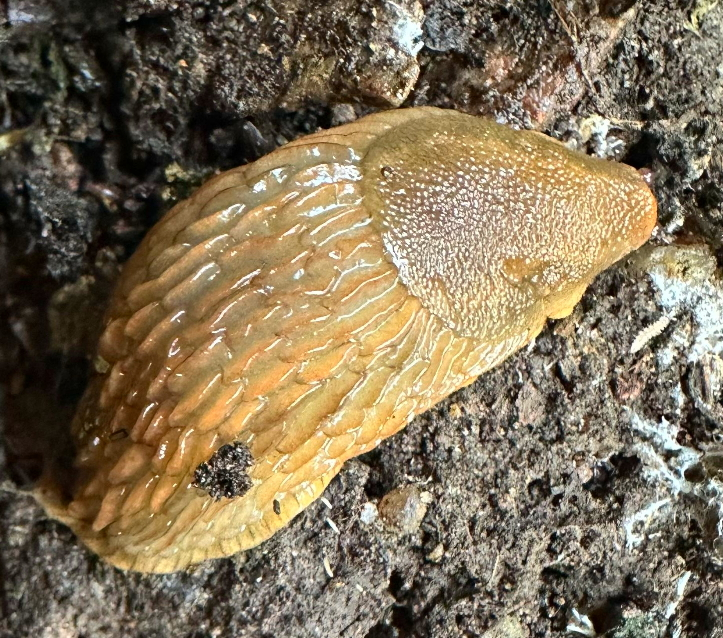
- Live specimen of Arion flagellus

Conservation status
- Least Concern (IUCN 3.1)

Scientific classification
- Kingdom: Animalia
- Phylum: Mollusca
- Class: Gastropoda
- Order: Stylommatophora
- Family: Arionidae
- Genus: Arion
- Species: A. flagellus

Binomial name
- Arion flagellus Collinge, 1893
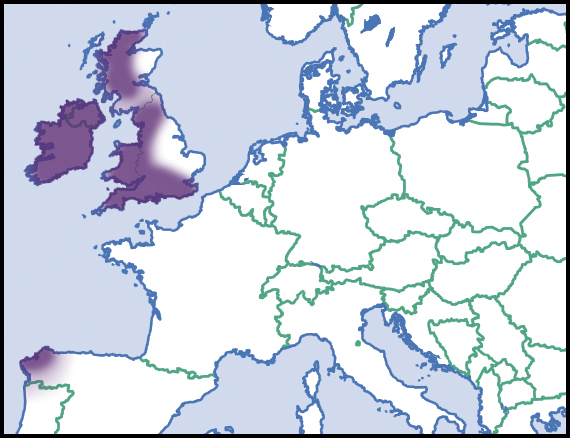
- Distributional range in Europe, scientific state of knowledge of 2012

Synonyms
- Arion (Arion) flagellus Collinge, 1893 alternative representation

= Arion flagellus =

Species of gastropod

Arion flagellus, also known by its common name (in the United Kingdom) the Durham slug, is a species of air-breathing land slug, a terrestrial pulmonate gastropod mollusc in the family Arionidae, the roundback slugs.

Variety

- Arion flagellus var. phillipsi Collinge, 1893 (unassessed)

== Distribution ==
This species is native to the northern part of the Iberian Peninsula, but has been introduced in various countries and islands including:

- Great Britain
- Ireland
- South Africa
- the Netherlands
- Canada

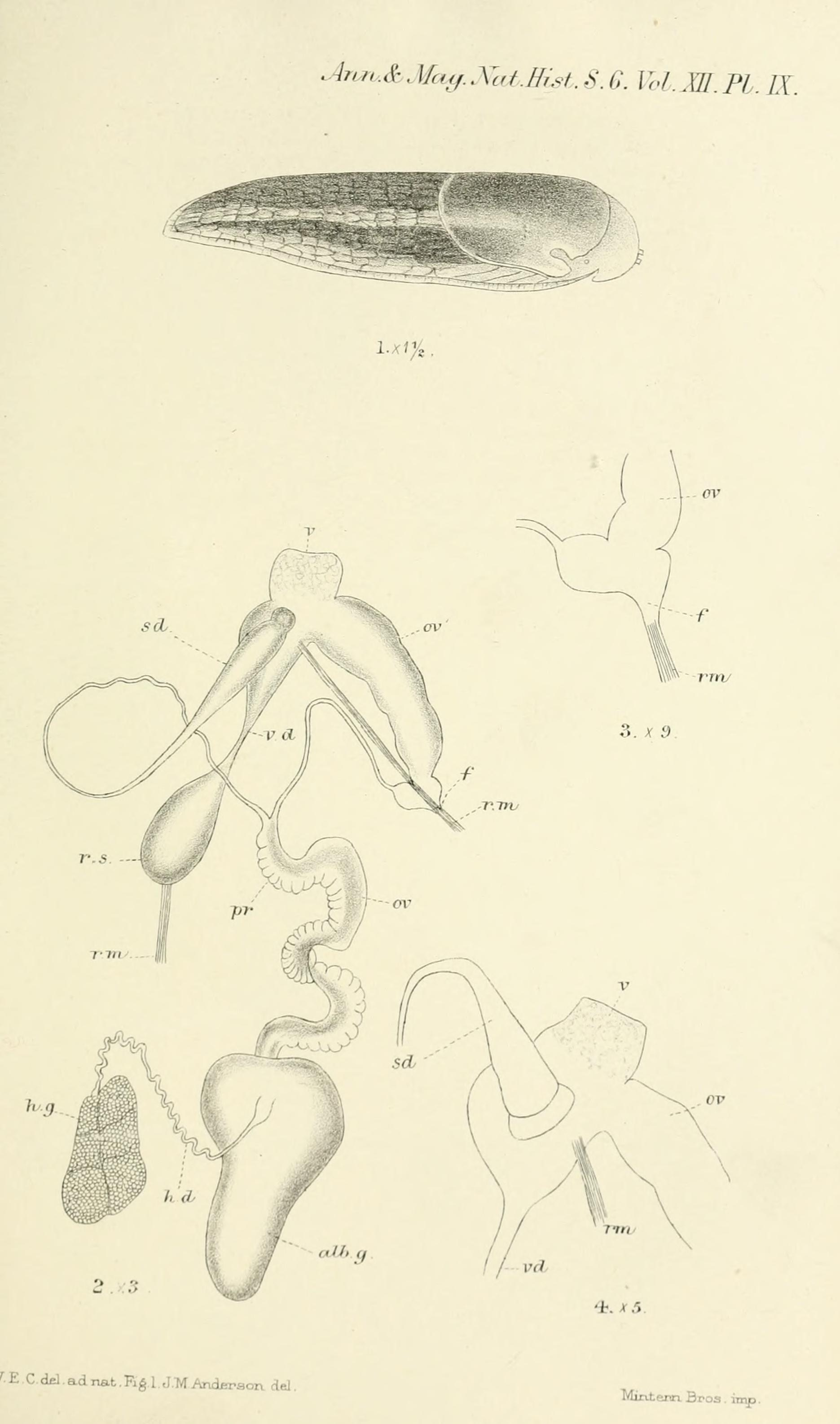
Arion flagellus illustration accompanying the species description
