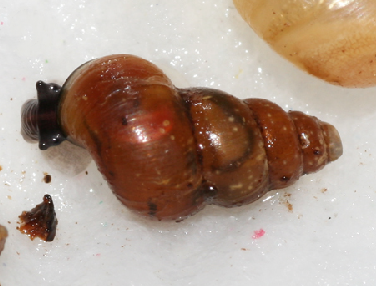
- Blanfordia bensoni

Scientific classification
- Kingdom: Animalia
- Phylum: Mollusca
- Class: Gastropoda
- Subclass: Caenogastropoda
- Order: Littorinimorpha
- Family: Pomatiopsidae
- Genus: Blanfordia; A. Adams, 1863

Diversity
- 3 species

Synonyms
- Vicina Pilsbry, 1924

= Blanfordia =

Genus of gastropods

Blanfordia is a genus of terrestrial gastropod mollusks in the family Pomatiopsidae. They are land snails which have an operculum.

The generic name Blanfordia is in honor of English naturalist William Thomas Blanford.

== Distribution ==
The genus Blanfordia is endemic to Japan. Blanfordia species live on Honshu and on Hokkaido.

Blanfodia and Fukuia are the only two genera of Pomatiopsidae that are endemic to Japan. They occur especially in the northern and western part of Japan on the coast of the Sea of Japan. There is a unique climate in the Sea of Japan with high precipitation as snowfall during the winter in the area of distribution of Blanfordia. Such species, unique to the region near the Sea of Japan, are known as "Japan Sea elements".

Hypothesized paleodistribution of clade, that includes of what is nowadays genus Blanfordia (Blanfordia simplex, Blanfordia japonica, Blanfordia bensoni) and "Fukuia" ooyagii on the northern part of the Japanese archipelago in Early Miocene (23-18 Ma).

Hypothesized paleodistribution of the same clade in Middle Pliocene to Late Pliocene (3.5-2 Ma).

Nowadays distribution of species of Blanfordia: light red square - Blanfordia bensoni; orange square - Blanfordia japonica; dark red triangle - Blanfordia simplex; light green triangle - Blanfordia sp.

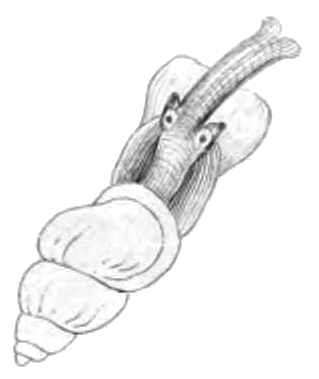
Drawing of dorsal view of Blanfordia japonica shows the position of eyes.

== Description ==
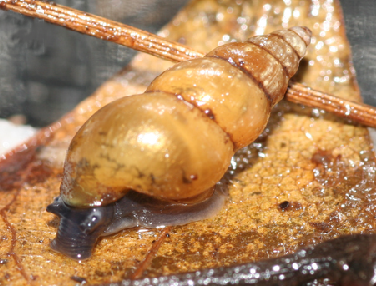
Live Blanfordia sp.

Some species of Blanfordia have a shell with varix.

Blanfordia has short stubby triangular tentacles. Short tentacles is derived character, while long tentacles is a primitive character (a plesiomorphic trait) within the Littorinimorpha. Eyes are at the base of tentacles. According to Nelson Annandale the snout is narrow and long.

There are lobes on each side of the frontal part of the foot and there is also a lobe with operculum on the foot. There is a groove on the foot dividing the foot into frontal and back part. While moving, it will put the tip of its snout on the ground and then it will drag itself while it is moving each part of the foot separately like a leech.

Gill filaments (ctenidium) are reduced in all species of Blanfordia. There is a verge with a massive gland in some species of Blanfordia. The nervous system of Blanfordia is concentrated.

Reproductive system: the bursa copulatrix is partly surrounded by albumen gland (posterior pallial oviduct). Albumen gland and spermathecal duct have a common opening. Sperm duct and also spermathecal duct emerges from mid-ventral part of the bursa copulatrix.

Paul Bartsch (1936) provided nomenclatural review of the genus Blanfordia with detailed description of its species.

Comparison of apertural views of shells (the scale is 1 mm):

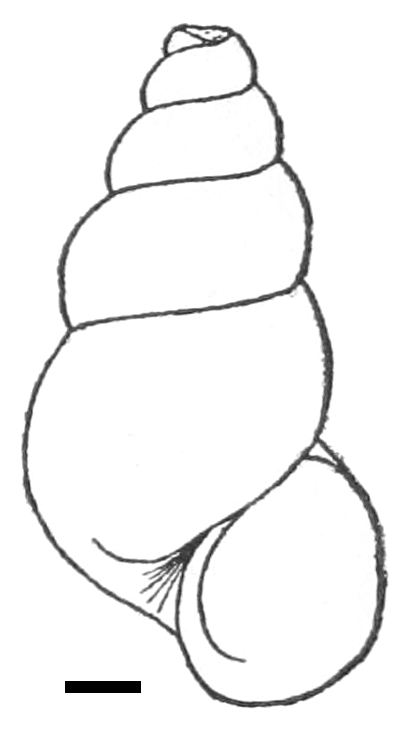
Blanfordia bensoni

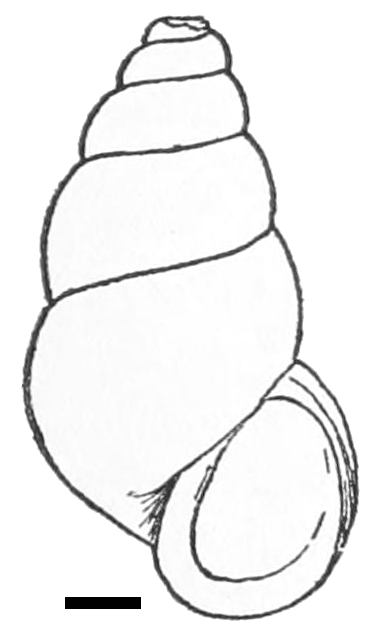
Blanfordia japonica

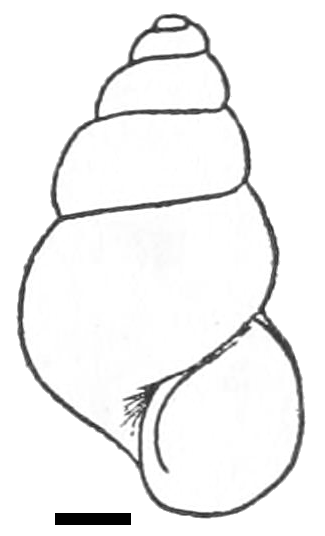
Blanfordia simplex

== Species ==
Species within the genus Blanfordia include:

- Blanfordia bensoni (Adams, 1861) - type species. The type species was subsequently designated by Geoffrey Nevill (1878).
- Blanfordia japonica (Adams, 1861)
- Blanfordia simplex Pilsbry, 1902

"Fukuia" ooyagii is the most closely related species to Blanfordia according to the molecular phylogeny analysis, but its generic assignment should be determined coupled with the investigation of its soft-part morphology.

The speciation of genus Blanfordia likely started around 6.4 million years ago in the Late Miocene, while the divergence between Blanfordia and "Fukuia" ooyagii is estimated to be around 17.4 million years ago in Early Miocene.

Synonyms:

- Blanfordia integra Pilsbry, 1924 is a synonym of Fukuia integra (Pilsbry, 1924). According to the molecular analyses of 18S ribosomal RNA, 28S ribosomal RNA, 16S ribosomal RNA, and cytochrome-c oxidase I (COI) genes by Kameda & Kato (2011) noted that Blanfordia integra is undoubtedly a member of the genus Fukuia. As early as 1979, Davis hypothetized that Blanfordia and Fukuia are either the same genus or that they may have a common ancestor.

== Cladogram ==
A cladogram showing phylogenic relations of genera within Pomatiopsidae:

- Pomatiopsidae
  - - - - subfamily Triculinae
        - Oncomelania
      - Cecina
    - - - Blanfordia
          - - Blanfordia simplex
            - Blanfordia japonica
          - - Blanfordia bensoni
            - Blanfordia sp. from Samani, Hokkaido
        - "Fukuia" ooyagii
      - Fukuia (including Fukuia integra)
  - Pomatiopsis

== Ecology ==
Blanfordia and Fukuia (that contain terrestrial Fukuia integra) are the only genera of terrestrial gastropods within the family Pomatiopsidae, which otherwise consists of mainly freshwater (but also seasonally amphibious) snails. Species of Blanfordia can be found from the sea coast to the mountains. They live in coastal dunes and littoral forests (Blanfordia simplex), from coastal to inland forests (Blanfordia japonica) and on the forest floor of inland forests (Blanfordia bensoni). Other land snails living in habitats of Blanfordia snails include for example diplommatinids, camaenids and bradybaenids.

The phylogenetic analyses by Kameda & Kato (2011) indicates that Japanese Pomatiopsinae have adapted from freshwater environment to terrestrial life (terrestrialization) at least twice (three Blanfordia species in one clade and Fukuia integra - formerly Blanfordia intergra species in another clade). This change has happened in regions with heavy snowfalls that face the Sea of Japan.
