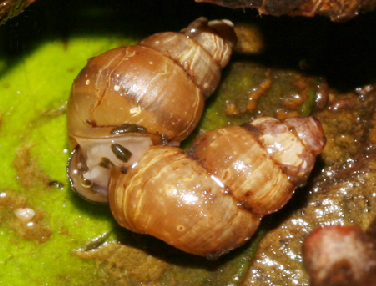
- A pair of Blanfordia simplex mating on the forest floor.

Scientific classification
- Kingdom: Animalia
- Phylum: Mollusca
- Class: Gastropoda
- Subclass: Caenogastropoda
- Order: Littorinimorpha
- Family: Pomatiopsidae
- Genus: Blanfordia
- Species: B. simplex

Binomial name
- Blanfordia simplex Pilsbry, 1902

Synonyms
- Blanfordia japonica var. simplex Pilsbry, 1902

= Blanfordia simplex =

Species of gastropod

Blanfordia simplex is a species of land snail that has an operculum, a terrestrial gastropod mollusk in the family Pomatiopsidae.

Henry Augustus Pilsbry described it as Blanfordia japonica var. simplex in 1902. He has elevated this taxon to specific level in 1903.

== Distribution ==
This species is endemic to Japan. It occurs widely along the Sea of Japan. The type locality is Nishigo, Uzen Province, Honshu.

It is a Near Threatened species.

== Description ==
Blanfordia simplex has a shell with 4.1-5.1 whorls. Pilsbry (1902) described the first whorl to be more or less worn. The color of the shell is yellowish-olivaceous. It has the lip hardly visible, only a mere trifle expanded.

The width of the shell is 3.7-4.2 mm. The height of the shell is 5.9-6.9 mm.

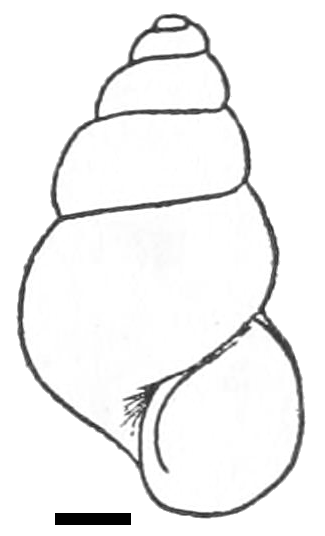
Drawing of apertural view of a shell. The scale is 1 mm.

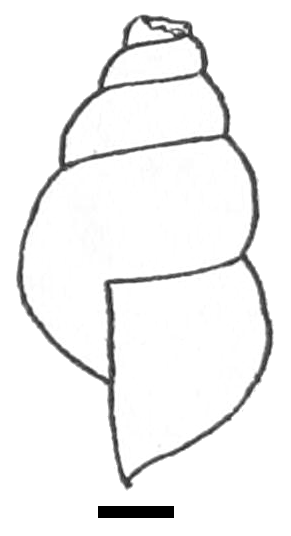
Drawing of lateral view of a shell. The scale is 1 mm.

The shell of Blanfordia simplex is shorter and broader than that of Blanfordia bensoni.

== Ecology ==
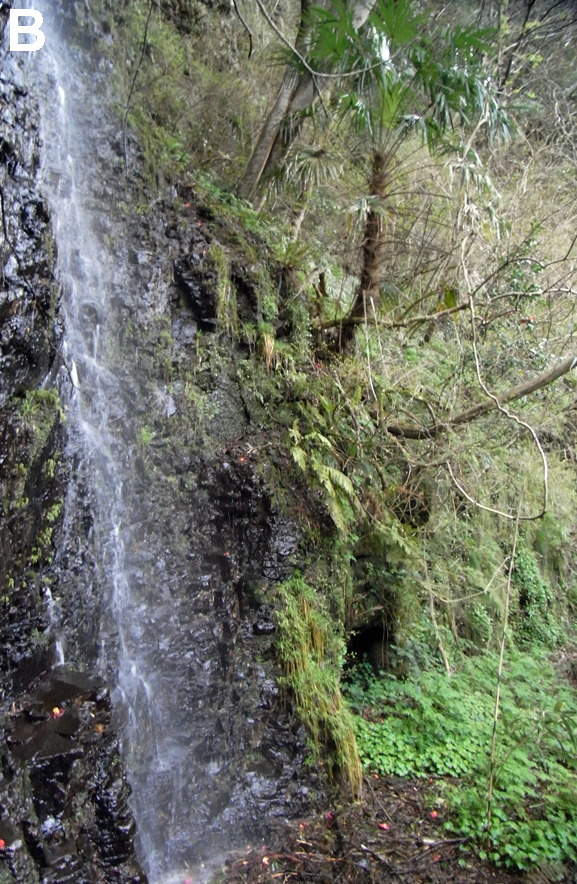
Habitat of terrestrial species Blanfordia simplex is on the forest floor.

This species lives on coastal dunes and in littoral forests.
