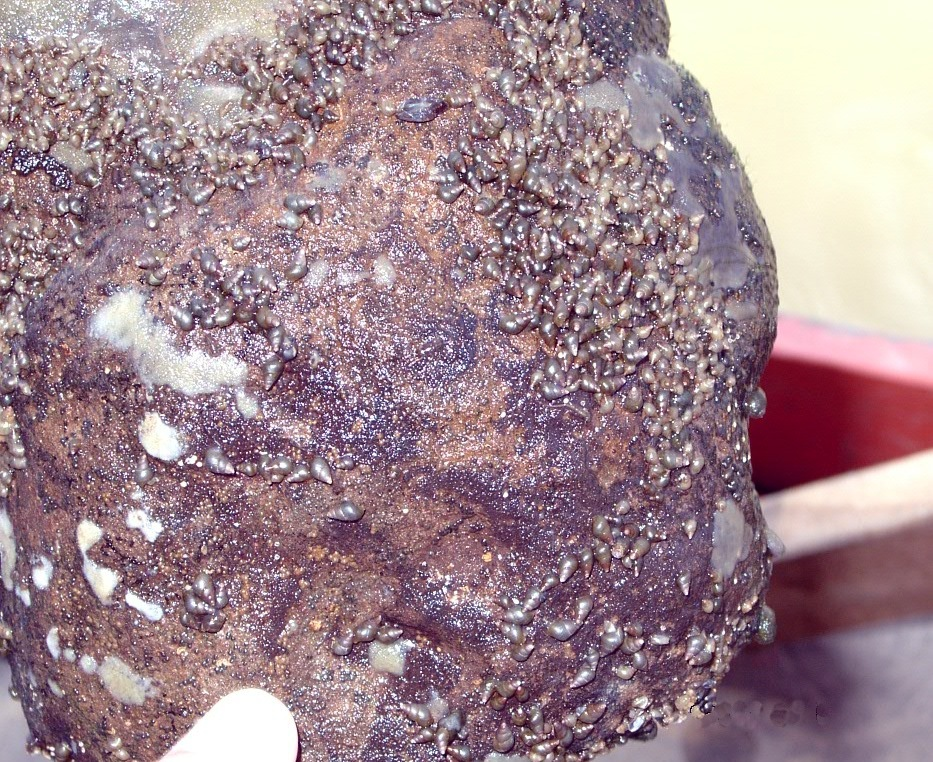
- Neotricula aperta on a stone

Scientific classification
- Kingdom: Animalia
- Phylum: Mollusca
- Class: Gastropoda
- Subclass: Caenogastropoda
- Order: Littorinimorpha
- Family: Pomatiopsidae
- Genus: Neotricula
- Species: N. aperta

Binomial name
- Neotricula aperta (Temcharoen, 1971)

Synonyms
- Lithoglyphopsis aperta

= Neotricula aperta =

- apertural view of a shell of Neotricula aperta

Species of gastropod

Neotricula aperta is a species of freshwater snail, an aquatic gastropod mollusk in the family Pomatiopsidae.

The first record of the transmission of S. mekongi by Neotricula aperta (Tricula aperta) was reported in 1973 using sentinel mice on Khong Island, Laos.

This species serves as a sole intermediate host for the fluke Schistosoma mekongi, that causes Mekong schistosomiasis.

== Distribution ==
Currently, Neotricula aperta is known from 31 localities in Cambodia, Laos and Thailand, involving nine river systems. The known range of Neotricula aperta is from just south of Kratié in the Mekong river of Cambodia to Kong Lor in Savannakhet of central Laos.

This species occurs:

- Along the Mekong River in Cambodia and in the upper Xe Kong river valley in northeastern Cambodia
- Laos
- In Northeast Thailand

The type locality is Ban Na on Khong Island, Laos.

== Description ==
A detailed account of the anatomy of Neotricula aperta was given by Davis et al. in 1976.

Three strains of Neotricula aperta have been recognized (called α, β and γ), on the basis of shell size and body pigmentation. Although all three strains are susceptible to Schistosoma mekongi (γ> > β > α), only the γ-strain is epidemiologically significant.

== Ecology ==
Neotricula aperta is exclusively epilithic or epixylic (on rotting wood). Neotricula aperta is found only in shallow areas (typically 0.5 to 3 m deep) of the Mekong river and some of its tributaries. The snails are restricted to areas where the current is moderate (around 2 × 10^{3} m^{3}s^{−1}), the water is clear and the bed rock forms (almost flat) platforms where agal aufwuchs is extensive. Such conditions exist only during the dry season in the lower Mekong (March to May) and so Neotricula aperta populations persist mostly by recruitment (from eggs laid on stones in the previous year) or re-colonization from other rivers, and transmission of Schistosoma mekongi is seasonal. Population density can reach up to 4734 snails per m².

In addition, Neotricula aperta is not known from waters of low conductivity or pH and is calciphilic; the pH of all Neotricula aperta habitats sampled to date is > 7.5 and the river systems in which the snails are found have always been those draining karst areas. More recently, Neotricula aperta has been found in the primary streams emerging from karst springs, close to the origins of the streams. The snail Neotricula aperta requires hard water to provide the calcium needed for rapid shell growth as populations re-establish in the Mekong river each year following the annual flood.

The ecological requirements of Neotricula aperta indicate that this snail will not become established in the reservoirs or downstream channels of dams in the region and that flooding of habitats by impoundment will eliminate all Neotricula aperta populations from the affected area.

Neotricula aperta grazes the algal epilithon and therefore, unlike species such as Biomphalaria (African vector of other kind of schistosomiasis), cannot survive in areas where sediment is depositing and preventing the growth of the algae upon which it feeds. Indeed, ecological studies of Neotricula aperta have shown that this snail is found only on stones covered with fine sediments and that this species is highly sensitive to silting.
