= Schistosoma mekongi =

Scientific classification
- Kingdom: Animalia
- Phylum: Platyhelminthes
- Class: Trematoda
- Order: Diplostomida
- Family: Schistosomatidae
- Genus: Schistosoma
- Species: S. mekongi

Binomial name
- Schistosoma mekongi Voge, Bruckner & Bruce, 1978

Species of fluke

Schistosoma mekongi is a species of trematodes, also known as flukes. It is one of the five major schistosomes that account for all human infections, the other four being S. haematobium, S. mansoni, S. japonicum, and S. intercalatum. This trematode causes schistosomiasis in humans.

Freshwater snail Neotricula aperta serves as an intermediate host for Schistosoma mekongi.

== History ==
Schistosomiasis was first reported in the Mekong River's Lower Basin region in 1957, from Laotian island of Khong to Cambodian province of Kratié, specifically. It was believed that the cause of these cases was Schistosoma japonicum until 1978, when Neotricula aperta was discovered and it was determined that the Schistosome was a unique species, Schistosoma mekongi. In 1967, a WHO-mission was sent to Champasack, confirming the infections, and putting focus on how it was being transferred. In 1989, the Ministry of Health in Laos initiated its first medicational intervention in the communities in Khong and Mounlapamok. One third of children were found to be positive for S. mekongi. This launched an effort to implement health information, education, and communication of the disease in addition to chemotherapy. This intervention was performed annually until 1995, and continued to 1999. After several rounds of praziquantel, the prevalence of S. mekongi infections has dropped to as low as 2% in some villages. The first national policy and strategy for control of helminth infections was developed and endorsed by the Cambodian MoH in 2009. This served as the backbone of future helminth control. A specific national schistosomiasis elimination action plan for the period 2016–2020 has been developed as a guidance for the National Control Program. This plan is supported by a Technical Taskforce at the central, provincial and district levels, and the task-force members are experts from the ministries, which are already involved by the National Committee for NTD Control.

== Characteristics ==
Schistosoma mekongi shares many general characteristics with other schistosomes, particularly S. japonicum, but it does have crucial differences. S. mekongi eggs are 30–55 μm and have a diminutive spine, and only 95 per mating pair are produced per day, whereas S. japonicum eggs are larger and produce on average 250 per day. N. aperta infected release on 42 cercaria per day, far lower than other Schistosomes.

== Epidemiology ==
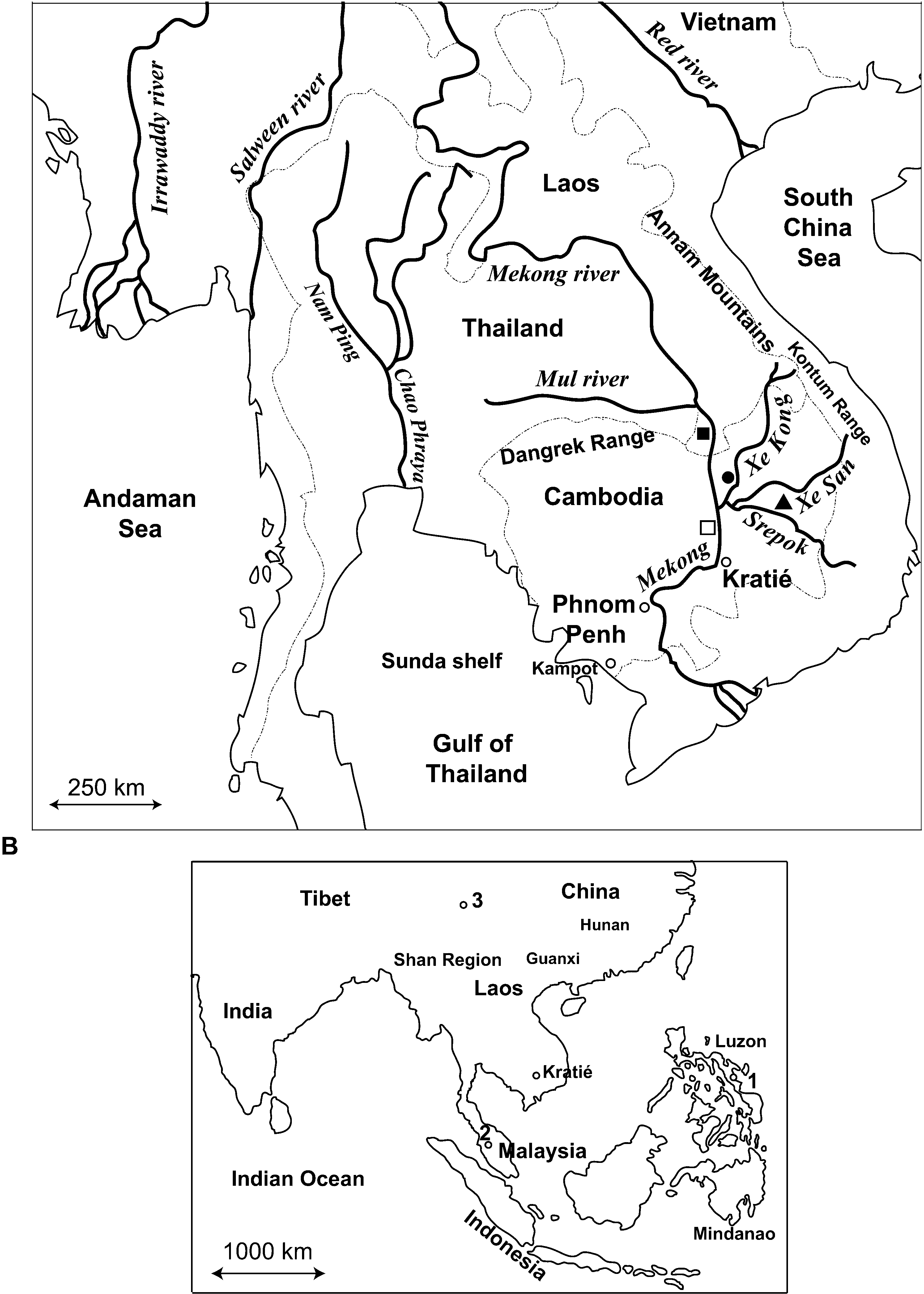
Endemic region

Schistosoma mekongi is found in the Lower Mekong river basin region, from Khong Island in Laos to Kratié Province, Cambodia. Schistosomiasis mekongi has also been found in the province of Champasack in the southern regions of Laos, and has also been found in eastern Thailand. In fact, S. mekongi has shown that it has the smallest distribution of any schistosome species. Transmission of Schistosoma mekongi occurs in the low water season in this geographical area. Approximately 140,000 people are at risk for S. mekongi infection. This is quite a small number, but infection and re-infection sustain the disease in these populations. These affect children the most because of their high level of water contact. Reservoir hosts also play a big role in keeping the disease around, although the number of reservoir hosts for the Mekong species is less than that of other species. With the use of stool examinations, only about 1500 people are shown to be infected, but it is projected that more than 10 times this number is more accurate. In 1989, a universal mass treatment with praziquantel of the people of Khong Island was performed. In 1995, a similar treatment was performed in Cambodia. In some areas, this treatment was highly effective, eliminating S. mekongi. In other regions, particularly Khong Island, there was little effect.

Attempting to control the intermediate host with a molluscicides also had no long-term effect.

== Life cycle/etiology ==
Schistosoma mekongi infections are caused by the penetration of the skin by the cercariae stage of the parasite. Eggs are released into the water in urine or fecal matter. These eggs hatch and release miracidia, which penetrate and infect the intermediate host, the snail Neotricula aperta. Sporocysts are then released in the water by either successive generations of snails or by predatory birds in the area eating infected snails and defecating the sporocysts in the water. The sporocysts then mature into cercariae that penetrate the skin and develop into schistosomulae. The schistosomulae circulate in the host blood and turn into adults. Adult worms release eggs into the bloodstream that lodge in the small capillaries of the intestine or bladder, penetrate the wall, and are released in feces or urine, respectively. The cycle then repeats itself. Schistosoma mekongi is much like Schistosoma japonicum in that adults more frequently in the superior mesenteric veins, but can be found in the central nervous system.

== Treatment and prevention ==
Treatment for all types of schistosomiasis are the same, but first step to treatment is always to see a physician. They will likely treat you with praziquantel for 1–2 days to treat all schistosomiasis infections. To prevent yourself from getting the parasite you should boil all drinking water and try to restrain from swimming in areas of slow current or evidence of rotting wood in the dry season.

== Reservoir hosts ==
The reservoir hosts for Schistosoma mekongi are dogs and pigs. It is believed that S. mekongi is unable to use cattle, such as water buffalo, as an effective reservoir host, unlike its close cousin S. japonicum.
