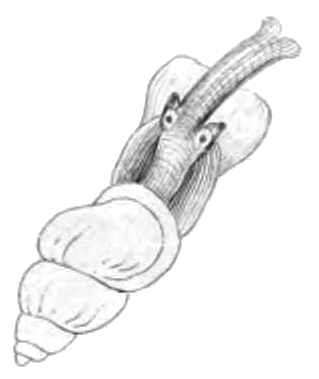
- Drawing of dorsal view of Blanfordia japonica

Scientific classification
- Kingdom: Animalia
- Phylum: Mollusca
- Class: Gastropoda
- Subclass: Caenogastropoda
- Order: Littorinimorpha
- Family: Pomatiopsidae
- Genus: Blanfordia
- Species: B. japonica

Binomial name
- Blanfordia japonica (A. Adams, 1861)

Synonyms
- Tomichia japonica A. Adams, 1861; Blanfordia bensoni minor Pilsbry, 1901; Blanfordia pilbryana Annandale, 1924

= Blanfordia japonica =

Species of gastropod

Blanfordia japonica is a species of land snail which has an operculum, a terrestrial gastropod mollusk in the family Pomatiopsidae.

== Distribution ==
This species is endemic to Japan. The type locality is Sado.

It is a Near Threatened species.

== Description ==
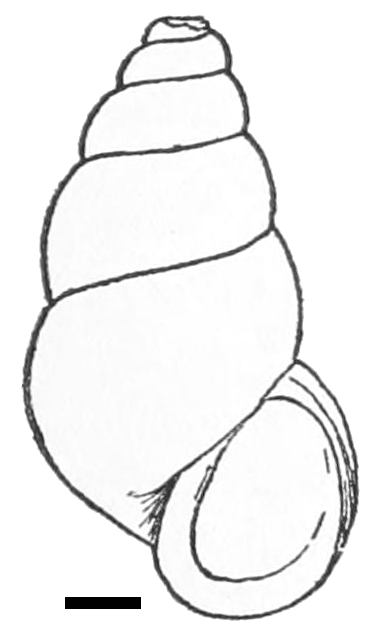
Drawing of apertural view of a shell. The scale is 1 mm.

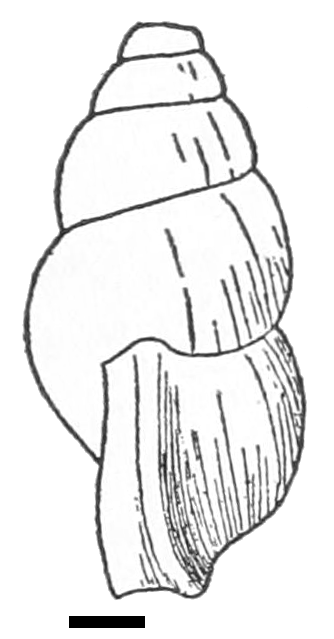
Drawing of lateral view of a shell. The scale is 1 mm.

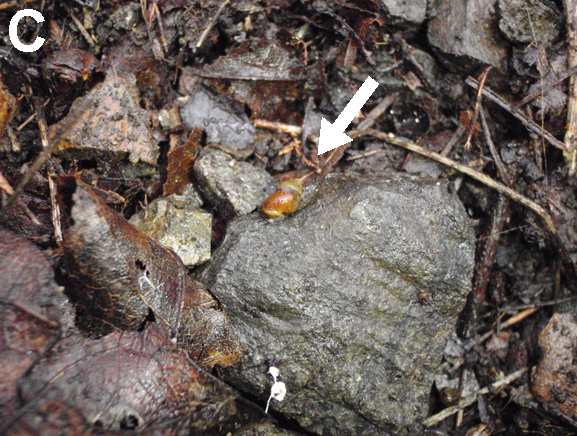
Blanfordia japonica on the forest floor.

== Ecology ==
This species lives from coastal areas to inland forests.
