= Floridiscrobs dysbatus =

Scientific classification
- Kingdom: Animalia
- Phylum: Mollusca
- Class: Gastropoda
- Subclass: Caenogastropoda
- Order: Littorinimorpha
- Family: Pomatiopsidae
- Genus: Floridiscrobs
- Species: F. dysbatus

Binomial name
- Floridiscrobs dysbatus (Pilsbry & McGinty, 1949)

Species of gastropod

Floridiscrobs dysbatus is a species of very small aquatic snail, an operculate gastropod mollusk in the family Hydrobiidae.

== Description ==
The maximum recorded shell length is 3.4 mm.

== Habitat ==
Minimum recorded depth is 0 m. Maximum recorded depth is 0 m.
