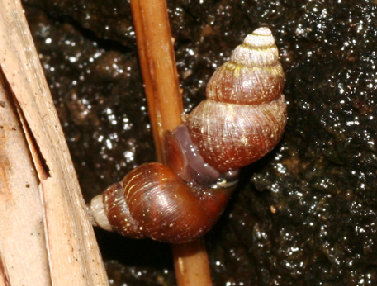
- A pair of Fukuia kurodai kurodai mating above the water line

Scientific classification
- Kingdom: Animalia
- Phylum: Mollusca
- Class: Gastropoda
- Subclass: Caenogastropoda
- Order: Littorinimorpha
- Family: Pomatiopsidae
- Genus: Fukuia
- Species: F. kurodai

Binomial name
- Fukuia kurodai Abbott & Hunter, 1949

= Fukuia kurodai =

Species of gastropod

Fukuia kurodai is a species of amphibious freshwater snail with an operculum, an aquatic gastropod mollusk in the family Pomatiopsidae.

Fukuia kurodai is the type species of the genus Fukuia.

== Subspecies ==
There are two subspecies of Fukuia kurodai:

- Fukuia kurodai kurodai Abbott & Hunter, 1949
- Fukuia kurodai niigataensis Minato, 1973

== Distribution ==
This species is endemic to Honshu, Japan.

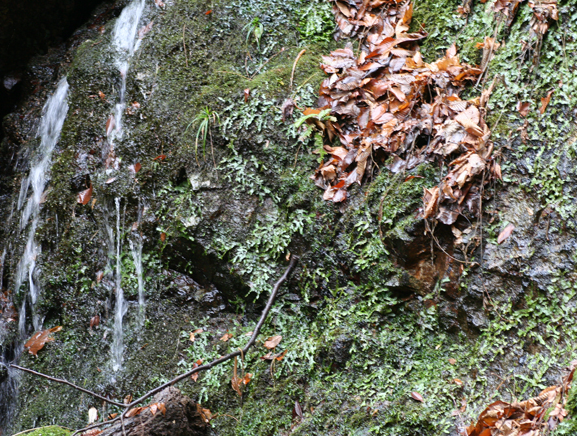
Dripping rocks covered with bryophytes beside a waterfall are inhabited by the amphibious species Fukuia kurodai

== Ecology ==
This species is a freshwater snail which lives in mountain streamlets. It is also an amphibious snail and it is often arboreal.
