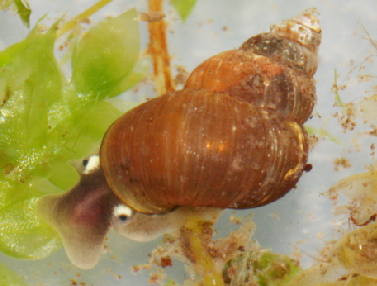
- Live individual of Fukuia multistriata

Scientific classification
- Kingdom: Animalia
- Phylum: Mollusca
- Class: Gastropoda
- Subclass: Caenogastropoda
- Order: Littorinimorpha
- Family: Pomatiopsidae
- Genus: Fukuia
- Species: F. multistriata

Binomial name
- Fukuia multistriata Abbott & Hunter, 1949

Synonyms
- Fukuia kurodai multistriata Abbott & Hunter, 1949

= Fukuia multistriata =

Species of gastropod

Fukuia multistriata is a species of amphibious freshwater snail with an operculum, an aquatic gastropod mollusk in the family Pomatiopsidae.

== Distribution ==
This species is endemic to Honshu, Japan.

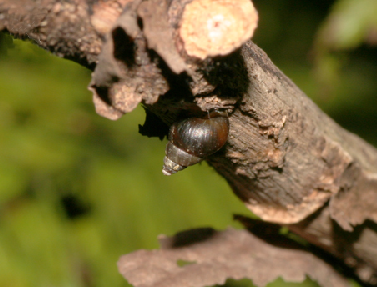
An individual of Fukuia multistriata resting on a tree branch.

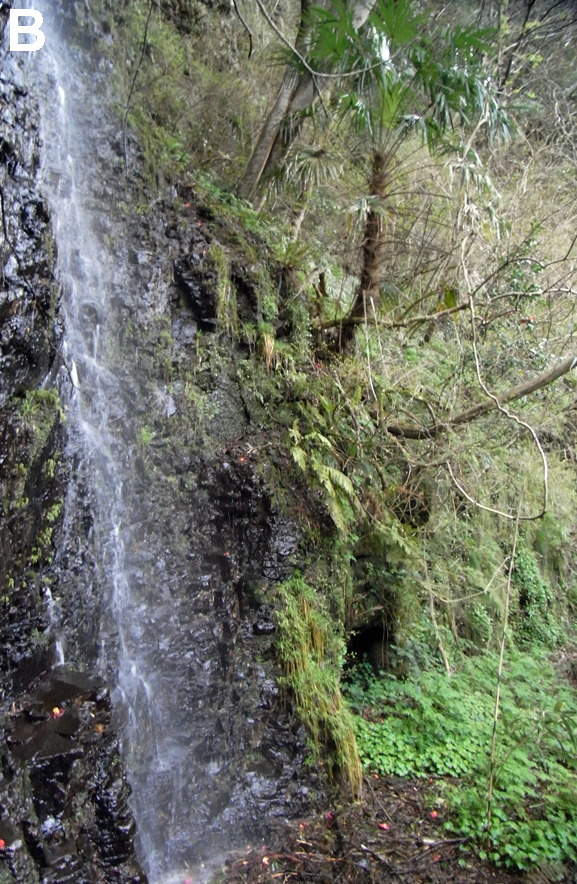
The habitat of the amphibious species Fukuia multistriata is beside the waterfall.

== Ecology ==
This species is a freshwater snail that lives in mountain streamlets. It is also an amphibious snail and it is often arboreal.
