= Fenouilia kreitneri =

Conservation status
- Endangered (IUCN 3.1)

Scientific classification
- Kingdom: Animalia
- Phylum: Mollusca
- Class: Gastropoda
- Subclass: Caenogastropoda
- Order: Littorinimorpha
- Family: Pomatiopsidae
- Genus: Fenouilia
- Species: F. kreitneri

Binomial name
- Fenouilia kreitneri Neumayr, 1880

Synonyms
- Fenouilia bicingulata Heude, 1889; Jullienia carinata Fulton, 1904; Lithoglyphus kreitneri Neumayr, 1880

Species of gastropod

Fenouilia kreitneri is a species of small freshwater snail with gills and an operculum, aquatic gastropod mollusk in the family Pomatiopsidae.

== Distribution ==
This species is endemic to Erhai Lake, Yunnan Province, China.
