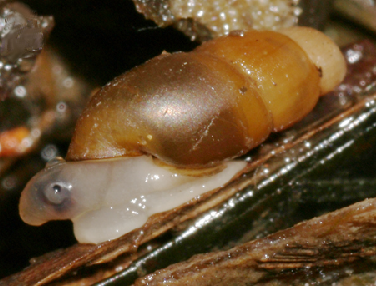
- A live individual of Cecina manchurica

Scientific classification
- Kingdom: Animalia
- Phylum: Mollusca
- Class: Gastropoda
- Subclass: Caenogastropoda
- Order: Littorinimorpha
- Family: Pomatiopsidae
- Genus: Cecina
- Species: C. manchurica

Binomial name
- Cecina manchurica A. Adams, 1861

= Cecina manchurica =

Species of gastropod

Cecina manchurica is a species of sea snail that has a gill and an operculum, a marine gastropod mollusk in the family Pomatiopsidae.

The specific name manchurica refers to Manchuria, the historical region where its type locality was situated.

== Distribution ==
This is an Endangered species (type I, CR+EN) in Japan.

The type locality is "Olga and Vladimir Bays, Manchuria, under damp logs near the sea", today in Primorsky Krai, Russia.

== Ecology ==
This species lives in very shallow water in littoral habitats, including decaying seaweed stranded on the beach.
