= S. japonicum =

S. japonicum may refer to:

- Schistosoma japonicum, an important parasite and one of the major infectious agents of schistosomiasis
- Styphnolobium japonicum, the pagoda tree, Chinese scholar, Japanese pagodatree, a small tree or shrub species native to eastern Asia
