= Coxiella =

Coxiella is a taxonomic homonym:

- Coxiella (bacterium), genus of bacteria in the family Coxiellaceae
  - Coxiella burnetii, the causative agent of Q fever
- Coxiella (gastropod), genus of snails from saline lakes in the family Pomatiopsidae
