= Pomatiopsis lapidaria =

Conservation status
- Least Concern (IUCN 3.1)

- Secure (NatureServe)

Scientific classification
- Kingdom: Animalia
- Phylum: Mollusca
- Class: Gastropoda
- Subclass: Caenogastropoda
- Order: Littorinimorpha
- Family: Pomatiopsidae
- Genus: Pomatiopsis
- Species: P. lapidaria

Binomial name
- Pomatiopsis lapidaria (Say, 1817)

Synonyms
- Cyclostoma lapidaria Say, 1817; Pomatiopsis hinkleyi Pilsbry, 1896; Pomatiopsis praelonga Brooks & MacMillan, 1940; Pomatiopsis scalaris F. C. Baker, 1927

Species of gastropod

Pomatiopsis lapidaria is an amphibious species of snail with gills and an operculum, a gastropod mollusk in the family Pomatiopsidae.

Pomatiopsis lapidaria is the type species of the genus Pomatiopsis.

== Distribution ==
The distribution of Pomatiopsis lapidaria includes the USA.

The type locality was not recorded.

== Ecology ==
Pomatiopsis lapidaria is amphibious: it lives in damp or wet habitats on marshy ground and in soil that is periodically flooded.

Dundee (1957) described the life history and the anatomy of Pomatiopsis lapidaria in detail.
