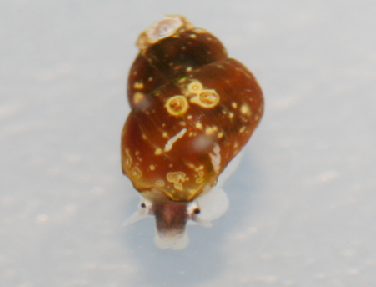
- Oncomelania minima

Scientific classification
- Kingdom: Animalia
- Phylum: Mollusca
- Class: Gastropoda
- Subclass: Caenogastropoda
- Order: Littorinimorpha
- Family: Pomatiopsidae
- Genus: Oncomelania
- Species: O. minima

Binomial name
- Oncomelania minima P. Bartsch, 1936

= Oncomelania minima =

Species of gastropod

Oncomelania minima is a species of freshwater snail, an aquatic gastropod mollusk in the family Pomatiopsidae.

== Distribution ==
distribution of Oncomelania minima

This species occurs in Ishikawa Prefecture and in Sado Island, Niigata Prefecture, Japan.

It is Vulnerable species in Japan.

== Ecology ==
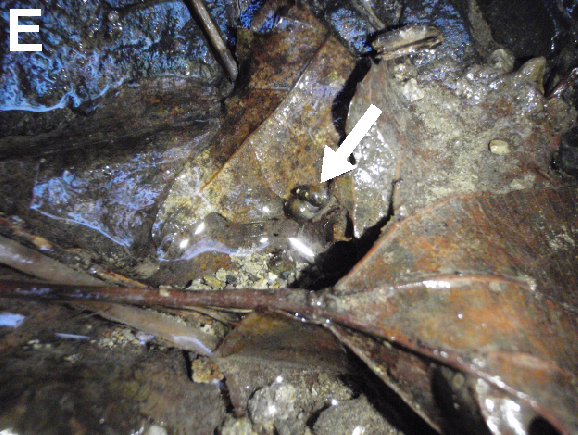
Photo of two Oncomelania minima in a mountain streamlet.

Oncomelania minima is a freshwater species which inhabits mountain streamlets.
