= Kunmingia =

Scientific classification
- Domain: Eukaryota
- Kingdom: Animalia
- Phylum: Mollusca
- Class: Gastropoda
- Subclass: Caenogastropoda
- Order: Littorinimorpha
- Family: Pomatiopsidae
- Genus: Kunmingia; Davis & Kuo, 1981

Genus of gastropods

Kunmingia is a genus of freshwater snails with gills and an operculum, aquatic gastropod mollusks in the family Pomatiopsidae.

== Species ==
Species within the genus Kunmingia include:

- Kunmingia kumningensis Liu, Wang & Zhang, 1980 - type species
