= Neoprososthenia =

Scientific classification
- Domain: Eukaryota
- Kingdom: Animalia
- Phylum: Mollusca
- Class: Gastropoda
- Subclass: Caenogastropoda
- Order: Littorinimorpha
- Family: Pomatiopsidae
- Genus: Neoprososthenia; Davis & Kuo, 1981

Diversity
- 4 species

Genus of gastropods

Neoprososthenia is a genus of freshwater snails with gills and an operculum, aquatic gastropod mollusks in the family Pomatiopsidae.

== Species ==
The genus was established for extant species that were previously placed in the genus Paraprososthenia.

Species within the genus Neoprososthenia include:

- Neoprososthenia hanseni (Brandt, 1970)
- Neoprososthenia iijimai (Brandt, 1970)
- Neoprososthenia levayi (Bavay, 1895) - type species
- Neoprososthenia poirieri (Brandt, 1970)
