= Fenouilia =

Scientific classification
- Domain: Eukaryota
- Kingdom: Animalia
- Phylum: Mollusca
- Class: Gastropoda
- Subclass: Caenogastropoda
- Order: Littorinimorpha
- Family: Pomatiopsidae
- Genus: Fenouilia; Heude, 1889

Genus of gastropods

Fenouilia is a genus of small freshwater snails with gills and an operculum, aquatic gastropod mollusks in the family Pomatiopsidae.

== Species ==
Species within the genus Fenouilia include:

- Fenouilia kreitneri Neumayr, 1880
