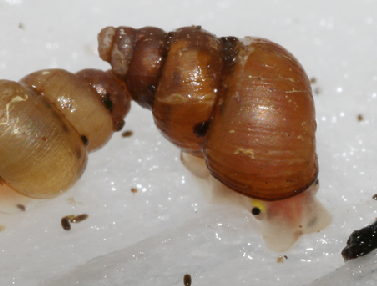
- Live Fukuia integra

Scientific classification
- Kingdom: Animalia
- Phylum: Mollusca
- Class: Gastropoda
- Subclass: Caenogastropoda
- Order: Littorinimorpha
- Family: Pomatiopsidae
- Genus: Fukuia
- Species: F. integra

Binomial name
- Fukuia integra (Pilsbry, 1924)

Synonyms
- Blanfordia integra Pilsbry, 1924

= Fukuia integra =

Species of gastropod

Fukuia integra, also known as Blanfordia integra, is a species of land snail which has an operculum, a terrestrial gastropod mollusk in the family Pomatiopsidae.

== Taxonomy ==
Henry Augustus Pilsbry described this species under name Blanfordia integra in 1924.

Davis (1979) noted that genital structures of Blanfordia integra are similar to those of Fukuia. Although he doubted if Fukuia and Blanfordia are morphologically distinct based on such evidence, it is an apparent confusion resulting from the inadequate generic assignment of Blanfordia integra.

According to the molecular analyses of 18S ribosomal RNA, 28S ribosomal RNA, 16S ribosomal RNA, and cytochrome-c oxidase I (COI) genes by Kameda & Kato (2011) noted that Blanfordia integra is undoubtedly a member of the genus Fukuia.

== Distribution ==
This species is endemic to Japan. It is a Vulnerable species.

The type locality is Makuragisan, Izumo, Honshu.

== Description ==
The shape of the shell is broadly ovate. The shell has 4.5-5.3 whorls. There is a strong axial sculpture on the shell.

The width of the shell is 2.4-3.2 mm. The height of the shell is 3.6-5.2 mm.

== Ecology ==
This species lives as a terrestrial snail in inland forests. It is often arboreal.
