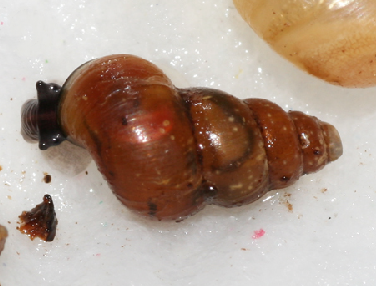
- Dorsal view of a live Blanfordia bensoni

Scientific classification
- Kingdom: Animalia
- Phylum: Mollusca
- Class: Gastropoda
- Subclass: Caenogastropoda
- Order: Littorinimorpha
- Family: Pomatiopsidae
- Genus: Blanfordia
- Species: B. bensoni

Binomial name
- Blanfordia bensoni (A. Adams, 1861)

Synonyms
- Tomichia Bensoni A. Adams, 1861; Blanfordia hirasei Pilsbry, 1900; Pomatiopsis Hirasei Pilsbry, 1900

= Blanfordia bensoni =

Species of gastropod

Blanfordia bensoni is a species of land snail which has an operculum, a terrestrial gastropod mollusk in the family Pomatiopsidae.

Blanfordia bensoni is the type species of the genus Blanfordia.

== Distribution ==
This species is endemic to Japan. The type locality is "Matsumai, Yesso", Hokkaido.

It is a Vulnerable species.

== Description ==
The height of the shell is 8.5 mm.

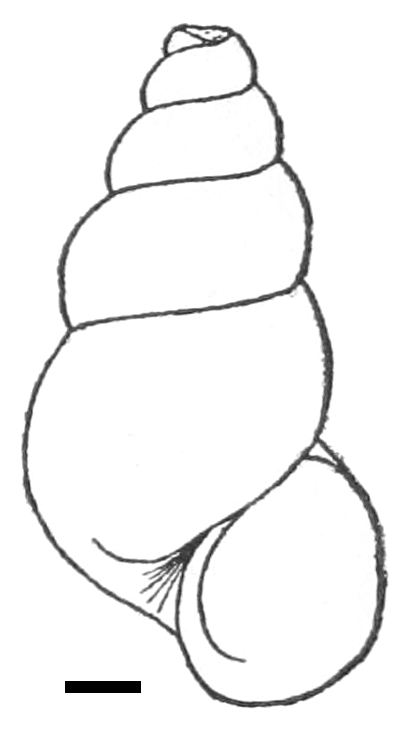
Drawing of apertural view of a shell. The scale is 1 mm.

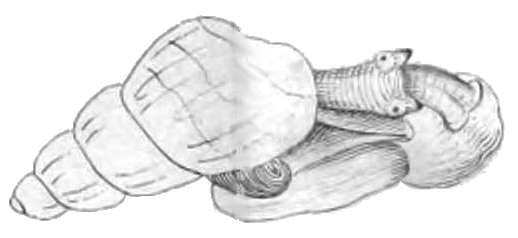
Drawing of Blanfordia bensoni.

== Ecology ==
This species lives as a terrestrial snail in inland forests.
