= Tomichia cawstoni =

Conservation status
- Critically Endangered (IUCN 3.1)

Scientific classification
- Kingdom: Animalia
- Phylum: Mollusca
- Class: Gastropoda
- Subclass: Caenogastropoda
- Order: Littorinimorpha
- Family: Tomichiidae
- Genus: Tomichia
- Species: T. cawstoni

Binomial name
- Tomichia cawstoni Connolly, 1939

Species of gastropod

Tomichia cawstoni is a species of very small freshwater snails which have a gill and an operculum, gastropod molluscs or micromolluscs in the family Tomichiidae.

== Distribution ==
This species is endemic to South Africa. The type locality is Kokstad, KwaZulu-Natal, Eastern Cape Province, South Africa.

== Description ==
The width of the shell is 2.5 mm.; the height of the shell is 4.6 mm. Spire short, and flat sided. Whorls weakly convex.

== Ecology ==
The natural habitat for this species is rivers in riverine forests, predominantly of freshwater in contrast to other species which inhabit ephemeral streams and rivers.

== Threats ==
Species of the genus Tomichia are particularly susceptible to changes in their ecosystem, and thus species such as Tomichia cawstoni are greatly threatened by pollution and climatic changes (especially in the form of changes in rain cycles). In Kokstad, it is threatened by pollution and trampling from commercial cattle farming operations. All suitable locations for this species' inhabitance have since been found destroyed, restricting the species to the type locality.
