= Paraprososthenia =

Paraprosostenia Temporal range: Pleistocene

Scientific classification
- Kingdom: Animalia
- Phylum: Mollusca
- Class: Gastropoda
- (unranked): clade Caenogastropoda clade Hypsogastropoda clade Littorinimorpha
- Superfamily: Rissooidea
- Family: Pomatiopsidae
- Subfamily: Triculinae
- Tribe: Jullieniini
- Genus: †Paraprososthenia Annandale, 1919

Extinct genus of gastropods

†Paraprosostenia is a fossil genus of prehistoric freshwater snails, aquatic gastropod mollusks in the family Pomatiopsidae.

== Species ==
Species within the genus Paraprosostenia include:

- Paraprosostenia minuta Annandale, 1919 - type species, fossil of Pleistocene of Namma in northern Burma, The length of the shell is 6 mm. It was found in freshwater lake beds, so it is presumed to be a freshwater species as is the case in all other Triculinae.

Davis (1979) classified also four extant species within the genus Paraprosostenia. Later Davis (1981) referred number of species in Paraprososthenia to be ten. Subsequently Davis et al. (1981) restricted the genus Paraprosostenia to the Pleistocene of Burma. These four extant species were moved to the newly established genus Neoprososthenia:

- (extant) Paraprososthenia hanseni Brandt, 1970 is a synonym of Neoprososthenia hanseni (Brandt, 1970)
- (extant) Paraprososthenia iijimai Brandt, 1970 is a synonym of Neoprososthenia iijimai (Brandt, 1970)
- (extant) Paraprososthenia levayi (Bavay, 1895) is a synonym of Neoprososthenia levayi (Bavay, 1895)
- (extant) Paraprososthenia poirieri (Brandt, 1970) is a synonym of Neoprososthenia poirieri (Brandt, 1970)
