= Tomichia differens =

Conservation status
- Endangered (IUCN 3.1)

Scientific classification
- Kingdom: Animalia
- Phylum: Mollusca
- Class: Gastropoda
- Subclass: Caenogastropoda
- Order: Littorinimorpha
- Family: Tomichiidae
- Genus: Tomichia
- Species: T. differens

Binomial name
- Tomichia differens Connolly, 1939

Species of gastropod

Tomichia differens is a species of freshwater gastropod in the family Tomichiidae endemic to perennial streams and rivers in Western Cape Province, South Africa. Described by Connolly in 1939, T. differens is found in two sites at De Kelders and Stilbaai, and has amphibious habits and a tolerance of slight salinity and desiccation throughout its habitats. The genus Tomichia is very sensitive to changes in ecosystem conditions, and thus are threatened by pollution and climate change (manifested here through rain cycles). The Stilbaai site is in danger of becoming uninhabitable due to residential developments and offshore drilling operations, and thus this species has been listed as Endangered by the IUCN (ver. 3.1).
