= Tomichia tristis =

Conservation status
- Critically Endangered (IUCN 3.1)

Scientific classification
- Kingdom: Animalia
- Phylum: Mollusca
- Class: Gastropoda
- Subclass: Caenogastropoda
- Order: Littorinimorpha
- Family: Tomichiidae
- Genus: Tomichia
- Species: T. tristis

Binomial name
- Tomichia tristis (Morelet, 1889)

Synonyms
- Hydrobia tristis Morelet, 1889; Tomichia lirata (Turton, 1932)

Species of gastropod

Tomichia tristis is a species of very small freshwater or brackish snail with a gill and an operculum, gastropod mollusc or micromollusc in the family Tomichiidae.

== Distribution ==
This species occurs in Eastern Cape Province, South Africa.
