= Hubendickia =

Scientific classification
- Kingdom: Animalia
- Phylum: Mollusca
- Class: Gastropoda
- Subclass: Caenogastropoda
- Order: Littorinimorpha
- Family: Pomatiopsidae
- Genus: Hubendickia; Brandt, 1968

Diversity
- 16–18 (14–16), Davis (1979) listed 16 species

Synonyms
- Manningiella Brandt, 1970 (in part)

Genus of gastropods

Hubendickia is a genus of freshwater snails with gills and an operculum, aquatic gastropod mollusks in the family Pomatiopsidae.

== Distribution ==
The distribution of the genus Hubendickia includes Thailand and China.

== Species ==
Species within the genus Hubendickia include:

- Hubendickia cingulata Brandt, 1974
- Hubendickia coronata Brandt, 1968
- Hubendickia crooki Brandt, 1968
- Hubendickia cylindrica Brandt, 1974
- Hubendickia gochenouri Brandt, 1968
- Hubendickia pellucida (Bavay, 1895) - synonyms: Pachydrobia pellucida Bavay, 1895; Manningiella pellucida Brandt, 1970
- Hubendickia polita (Brandt, 1970) - synonym: Manningiella polita Brandt, 1970
- Hubendickia rolfbrandti Temcharoen, 1971
- Hubendickia schlickumi (Brandt, 1968) - synonym: Paraprososthenia schlickumi Brandt, 1968
- Hubendickia scheutti (Brandt, 1968) - synonym: Paraprososthenia scheutti Brandt, 1968
- Hubendickia spiralis Brandt, 1968
- Hubendickia sulcata (Bavay, 1895) - synonyms: Pachydrobia sulcata Bavay, 1895; Hubendickia siamensis Brandt, 1968 - type species
- Hubendickia tuberculata Brandt, 1968
- Hubendickia new species from Mekong River, Thailand
- Hubendickia another new species from Mekong River, Thailand
