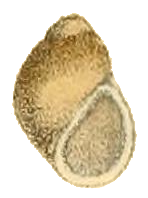
- Drawing of apertural view of the shell of Pachydrobiella brevis

Scientific classification
- Kingdom: Animalia
- Phylum: Mollusca
- Class: Gastropoda
- (unranked): clade Caenogastropoda clade Hypsogastropoda clade Littorinimorpha
- Superfamily: Rissooidea
- Family: Pomatiopsidae
- Subfamily: Triculinae
- Tribe: Jullieniini
- Genus: Pachydrobiella Thiele, 1928
- Species: P. brevis

Binomial name
- Pachydrobiella brevis (Bavay, 1895)

Synonyms
- Pachydrobia brevis Bavay, 1895

= Pachydrobiella =

Species of gastropod

Pachydrobiella brevis is a species of freshwater snail, an aquatic gastropod mollusc in the family Pomatiopsidae.

Pachydrobiella brevis is the only species in the genus Pachydrobiella.

== Distribution ==
The distribution of Pachydrobiella brevis includes Khong Island in the Mekong River, southern Laos. The type locality is Khong Island. This species is probably endemic to the Khong Island region.

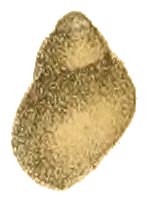
Drawing of abapertural view of the shell of Pachydrobiella brevis

== Description ==
The shape of the shell is ovate-conic. The shell is thick and smooth. The smooth shell is unique in the tribe Jullieniini. The outer lip is thick with growth lines.

The width of the shell is 2.5 mm. The height of the shell is 2.2–3.6 mm.

Thiele (1928) and Brandt (1970) made a drawing showing smooth teeth in the radula, but Davis (1979) showed multiserrate teeth in the radula.

== Ecology ==
Pachydrobiella brevis lives primarily in freshwater habitats that lack a current or have only a slight current. However this species sometimes or rarely also lives also in places where the current is moderate or strong all the way to whitewater.

This snail probably feeds on algae on stones.
