= Floridiscrobs =

Scientific classification
- Kingdom: Animalia
- Phylum: Mollusca
- Class: Gastropoda
- Subclass: Caenogastropoda
- Order: Littorinimorpha
- Family: Pomatiopsidae
- Genus: Floridiscrobs; Pilsbry & McGinty, 1949

Genus of gastropods

Floridiscrobs is a genus of very small aquatic snails, operculate gastropod mollusks in the family Pomatiopsidae.

== Species ==
Species within the genus Floridiscrobs include:

- Floridiscrobs dysbatus (Pilsbry & McGinty, 1949)
