= Fujiro Katsurada =

Japanese parasitologist (1867–1946)

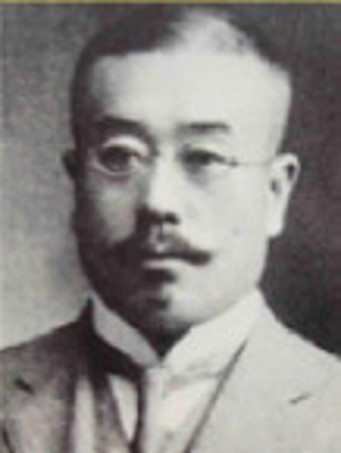
- Born: June 7, 1867; Kaga, Ishikawa
- Died: May 5, 1946 (aged 78)
- Other name: Kohkichi Shoda (庄田 豊哉 - Childhood name )
- Education: Kanazawa Medical School
- Known for: discovery of parasite called Schistosoma japonicum

Fujiro Katsurada (桂田 富士郎, Katsurada Fujirō; June 7, 1867 – April 5, 1946) was a Japanese parasitologist who discovered a parasite called Schistosoma japonicum.

== Biography ==
He was born on June 7, 1867 to the home of a samurai in Kaga, Ishikawa, and his childhood name was Kohkichi Shoda (庄田 豊哉?? Shōda ??). He graduated from Kanazawa Medical School, now the Faculty of Medicine, Kanazawa University in 1887, and entered the Department of Pathology at Tokyo University under Moriharu Miura (三浦 守治 Miura Moriharu). In the same year, he was adopted to Katsurada family, and his name was changed to Fujiro.

In 1890, he became lecturer of pathology and forensic pathology at Okayama Medical School, now Okayama University. Together with the pathologist Katsusaburo Yamagiwa and the internal medicine physician, he began study of paragonimiasis, a parasitic disease prevalent in Okayama.

In 1891, Inoue became an instructor at the Third Higher School Medical School and in 1893 was promoted to Professor of Pathology, the first professor of pathology in Japan except for Tokyo University. In 1899, he was ordered to study in Germany, and studied for two years at Freiburg University and wrote seven papers there. In 1901, he traveled to Italy, Australia and Russia, returning to Japan in February 1902 through London. In May 1902, he became Ph.D. of Medicine at Tokyo University with a research focus on trematoda.

== Academic work ==
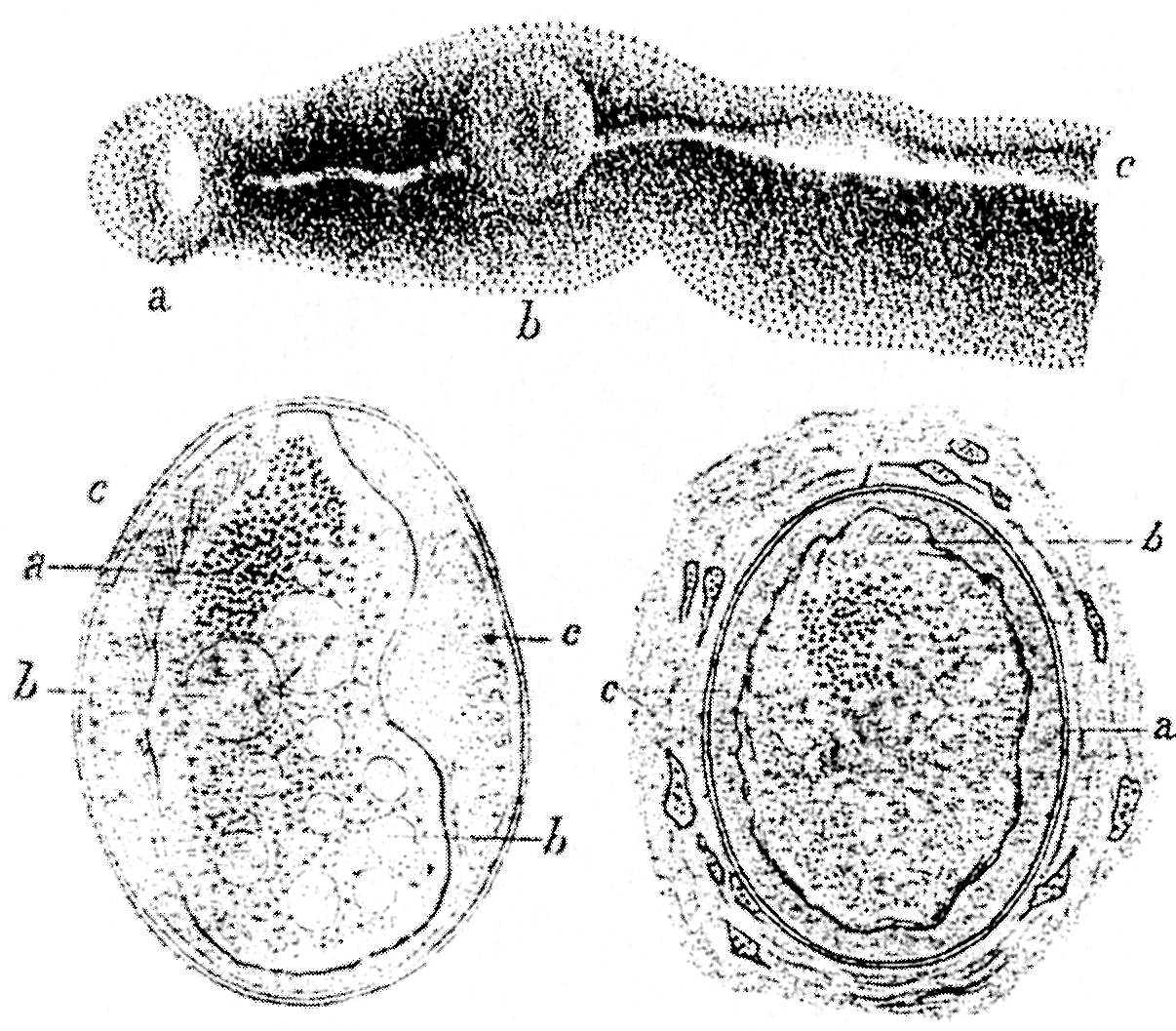

In April 1904, he discovered unknown eggs from a patient in Kofu, Yamanashi and assumed that this was a parasite different from Clonorchis sinensis, the agent of Clonorchis sinensis disease. With the cooperation of a physician, he obtained a cat and discovered in it a new type of parasite which he named Schistosomum japonicum Katsurada, which was later changed to Schistosoma japonicum Katsurada, was reported in a German article. He discovered the parasite only four days earlier than Akira Fujinami discovered the same parasite at Kyoto University.

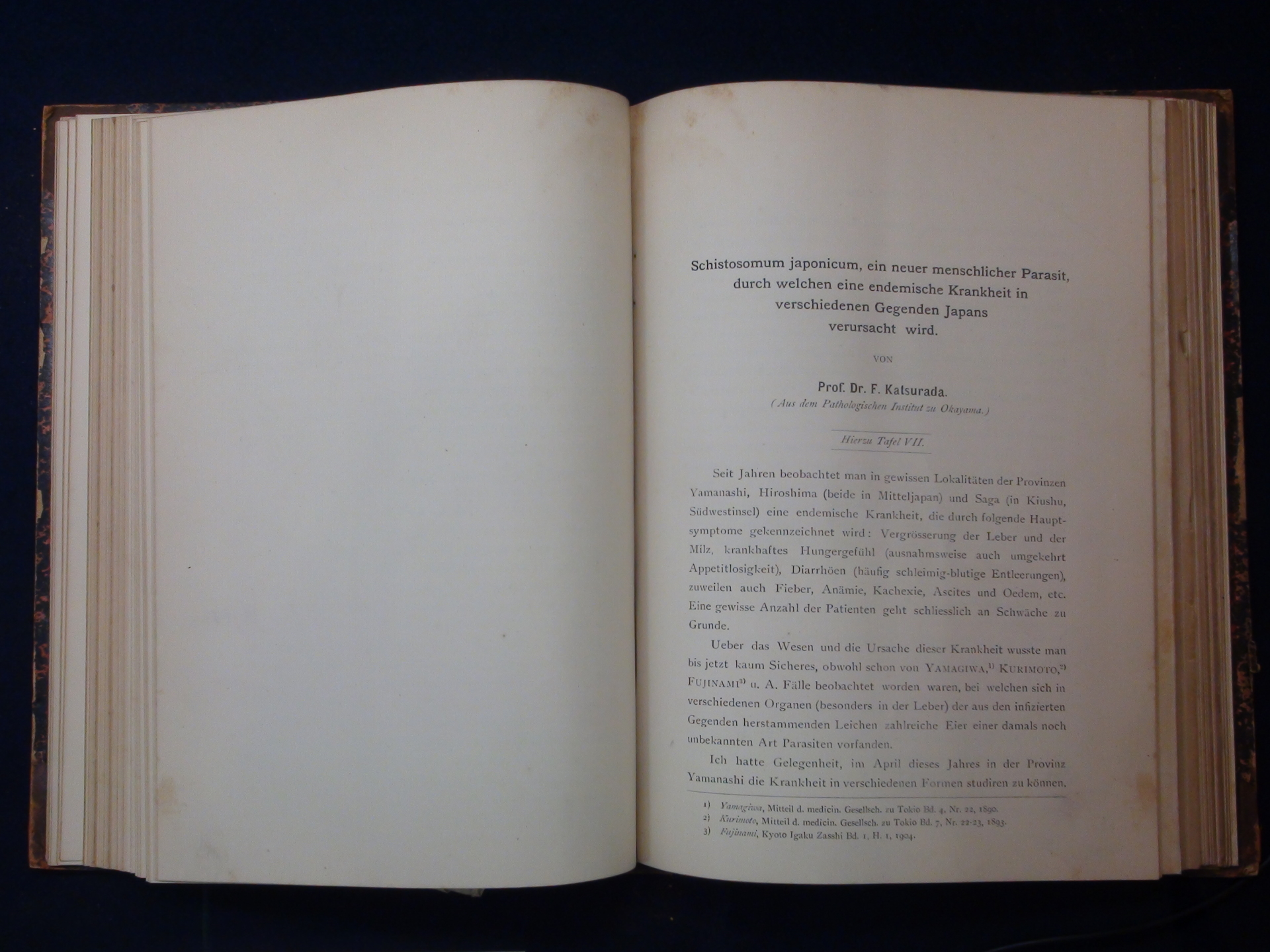
German paper on the parasite by Katsurada written in 1904

== Subsequent career ==
In 1905, he was made lecturer at Kyoto Imperial University Fukuoka Medical School (now Kyushu University) and was asked to assume the responsible professorship there. However, he preferred to stay in Okayama. On November 9, 1912, he was called to the Ministry of Education and suddenly dismissed, because Koreyoshi Kan, the principal of the Medical School, envied his popularity and reported his criticism. In protest this, students at the school went on strike twice requesting he be returned. He did not return to the Medical School, but Kan and three students had to leave the school. Katsurada on leave was dispatched to London in 1913 as a representative of the Japanese Medical Association. He lectured on Japanese Schistosoma there. In November 1914, he formally quit the Okayama Medical School and assumed the presidency of the Hospital for Seamen and Tropical Disease Institute at Kobe with the donation by Tokugoro Nakahashi, the president of Osaka Shosen (Shippin Company).

== Honours ==
He had been the vice president of the Japan Pathological Society for two years starting in 1911 and the president in 1918. He became the honorary president in 1931. In 1918, he started to fund seamen's society and tropical disease research encouragement society with his own money and money from the Japan Academy Prize (academics). He was made an honorary member of the Royal Medical Society (England) in 1929. He was the first Japanese member. In the same year, he encouraged the study of parasitology, and gave a fund which was named Katsurada Award. After his death, this was continued by the Japanese Parasitology Association.

In 1918, he was given the 8th Japan Academy Prize (academics) for the study of Japan Schistosomasis, together with Akira Fujinami.

== Death ==
On April 5, 1947, he died of pneumonia near his home, Daishōji at the age of 80.
