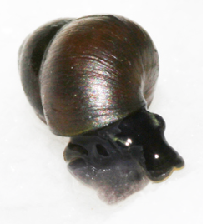
- A live individual of Fukuia ooyagii viewed from the anterior end

Scientific classification
- Kingdom: Animalia
- Phylum: Mollusca
- Class: Gastropoda
- Subclass: Caenogastropoda
- Order: Littorinimorpha
- Family: Pomatiopsidae
- Genus: Fukuia
- Species: F. ooyagii

Binomial name
- Fukuia ooyagii Minato, 1982

Synonyms
- Fukuia kurodai ooyagii Minato, 1982

= Fukuia ooyagii =

Species of gastropod

Fukuia ooyagii is a species of freshwater snail which has an operculum, an aquatic gastropod mollusk in the family Pomatiopsidae.

== Taxonomy ==
According to the molecular analyses of 18S ribosomal RNA, 28S ribosomal RNA, 16S ribosomal RNA, and cytochrome-c oxidase I (COI) genes by Kameda & Kato (2011) Fukuia ooyagii should be separated from Fukuia, and its generic assignment should be determined coupled with the investigation of its soft-part morphology. The most closely related genus is Blanfordia.

== Distribution ==
This species is endemic to the northern part of Honshu, Japan.

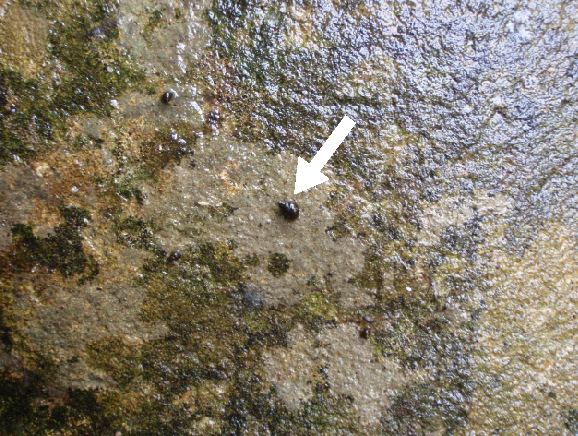
A live Fukuia ooyagii clinging to a wet rocky wall

== Ecology ==
This species is freshwater snail living in mountain streamlets.
