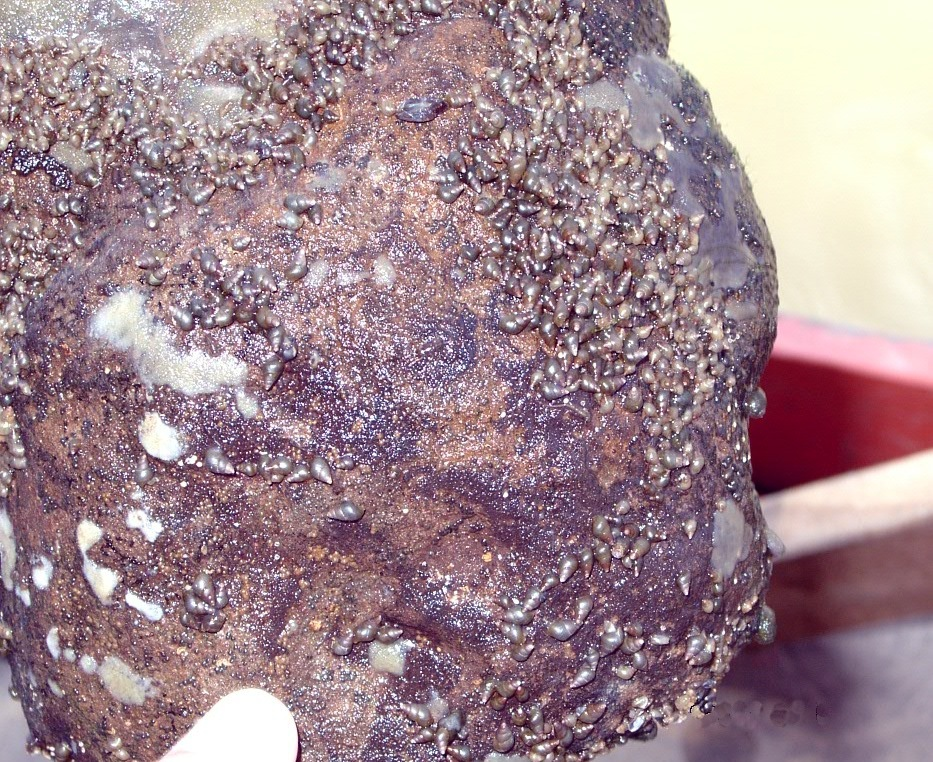
- Neotricula aperta on a stone

Scientific classification
- Kingdom: Animalia
- Phylum: Mollusca
- Class: Gastropoda
- Subclass: Caenogastropoda
- Order: Littorinimorpha
- Family: Pomatiopsidae
- Genus: Neotricula; Davis in Davis, Subba Rao & Hoagland, 1986

Diversity
- At least 5 species

= Neotricula =

Genus of gastropods

Neotricula is a genus freshwater snails which have a gill and an operculum, gastropod mollusks or micromollusks in the family Pomatiopsidae.

== Distribution ==
The distribution of Neotricula includes Hunan (at least 5 species), China, Laos (one species), Thailand and Cambodia.

== Species ==
Species within the genus Neotricula include:

- Neotricula aperta (Temcharoen, 1971)
- Neotricula burchi (Davis, 1968)
