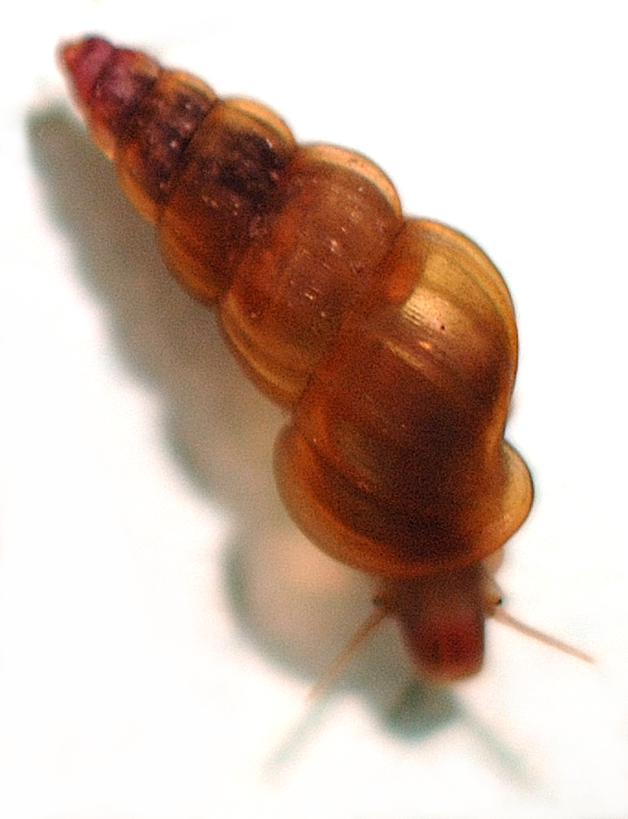

Scientific classification
- Kingdom: Animalia
- Phylum: Mollusca
- Class: Gastropoda
- Subclass: Caenogastropoda
- Order: Littorinimorpha
- Family: Pomatiopsidae
- Genus: Oncomelania
- Species: O. hupensis

Binomial name
- Oncomelania hupensis Gredler, 1881

= Oncomelania hupensis =

Species of gastropod

Oncomelania hupensis is a species of very small tropical freshwater snail, an aquatic gastropod mollusk in the family Pomatiopsidae.

== Distribution ==
Oncomelania hupensis has been found in China, Taiwan, and also in Japan, the Philippines, and on the Indonesian island of Sulawesi.

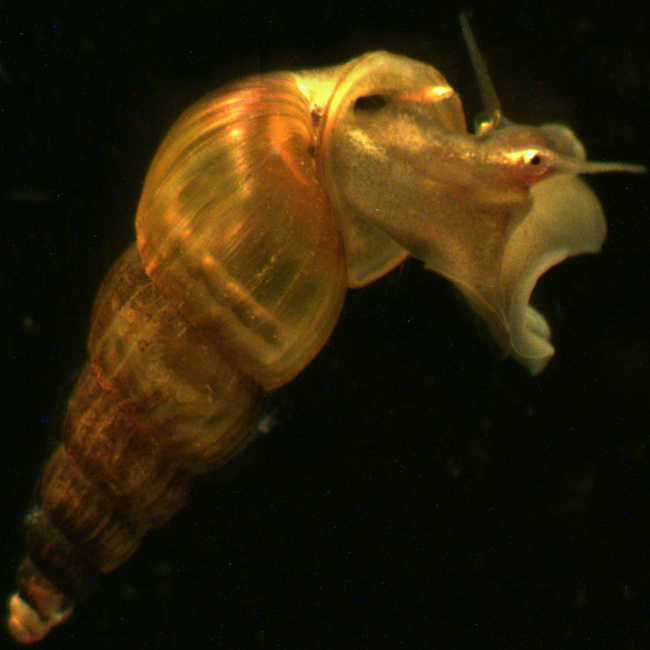
Ribbed-shelled Oncomelania hupensis hupensis. The ribs on the shell and varix surrounding the aperture are clearly visible, and a pair of eyes and a pair of tentacles are also visible on the head, with a strong contour of the foot below.

== Description ==
Over the past a few decades, the taxonomy of Oncomelania hupensis has been a dispute due to the variation in morphological characters such as shell sculpture, operculum etc. Phenotypically, Oncomelania hupensis can be separated into ribbed- and smooth- shelled morphotypes. In China, the typical morphotype of Oncomelania hupensis is ribbed-shelled, and its distribution is restricted to Yangtze River basin. Smooth-shelled snails are also distributed in mainland China, but are considered the same species and subspecies of Oncomelania hupensis.

Oncomelania hupensis reported in other Far East countries are smooth-shelled, and have been considered either as subspecies of Oncomelania hupensis or independent species in this genus.

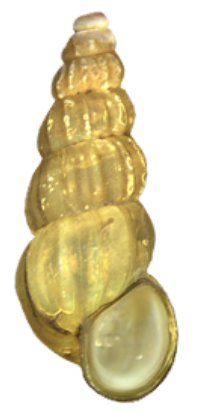
Photo of apertural view of a shell of Oncomelania hupensis hupensis.

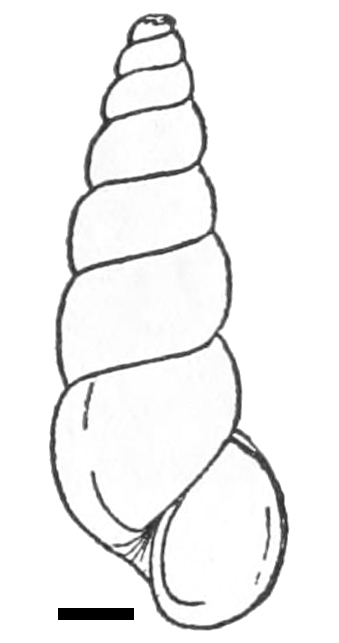
Drawing of apertural view of a shell of Oncomelania hupensis nosophora. The scale is 1 mm.

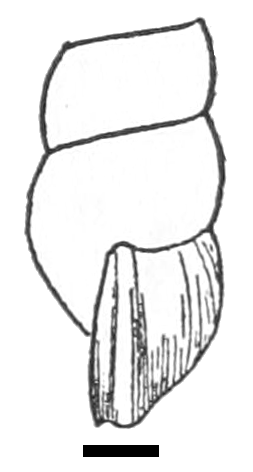
Drawing of lateral view of a part of a shell of Oncomelania hupensis nosophora. The scale is 1 mm.

== Subspecies ==
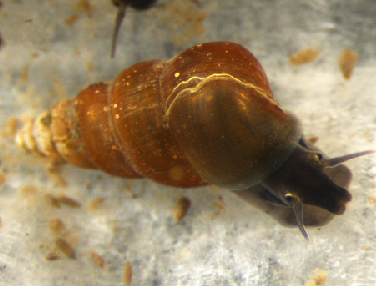
Oncomelania hupensis nosophora

- Oncomelania hupensis chiui (Habe & Miyazaki, 1962)—in Taiwan
- Oncomelania hupensis hupensis (Gredler, 1881)—in China. It is the most widely distributed subspecies of Oncomelania hupensis and lives primarily at low altitude but a few populations live in hilly areas in the drainage area of the Yangtze River in mainland China. It has varix, no matter whether the shell is smooth or ribbed, but most populations have ribbed-shell. Oncomelania hupensis hupensis has the same shell growth allometry as Oncomelania hupensis robertsoni but has a longer shell on average.
- Oncomelania hupensis formosana (Pilsbry & Hirase, 1905)—in Taiwan
- Oncomelania hupensis guangxiensis (Liu, 1981)—found in the Guangxi autonomous region of China
- Oncomelania hupensis iriomotensis Fukuda & Sawada in Sawada et al., 2026—in Iriomote Island, Okinawa
- Oncomelania hupensis lindoensis (Davis & Carney, 1973)—in Sulawesi, or as separate species Oncomelania lindoensis
- Oncomelania hupensis nosophora (Robson, 1915)—it is endangered (type I, CR+EN) taxon in Japan.
- Oncomelania hupensis quadrasi (Möllendorff, 1895)—in Philippines
- Oncomelania hupensis robertsoni (Bartsch, 1946)—it has a small, smooth shell but with no varix, is found in Sichuan and Yunnan provinces.
- Oncomelania hupensis tangi (Bartsch, 1936)—it has a smooth shell but with thick varix, is found in Fujian province and Guangxi autonomous region, separated geographically from the Yangtze River, and extensive control measures have brought this subspecies to near extinction.

There are 4 subspecies of Oncomelania hupensis in China: hupensis, robertsoni, tangi and guangxiensis.

Genetic confirmation of these four Chinese subspecies: Based on shell form, biogeographical and allozyme data, Davis et al. (1995) distinguished 3 subspecies of the Oncomelania hupensis in mainland China. However, Zhou et al. (2008) separated the Oncomelania hupensis guangxiensis out from Oncomelania hupensis tangi based on allozymes and amplified fragment length polymorphism (AFLP), which was verified recently by Li et al. with internal transcribed spacer (ITS) and 16S fragments.

== Genetics ==
It is believed that continuous control efforts, such as routine molluscicides in China, which have been used to control snails for about fifty years, might have imposed some effect on population genetics of these snails.

The complete mitochondrial genome of Oncomelania hupensis was released in 2010.

== Habitat ==
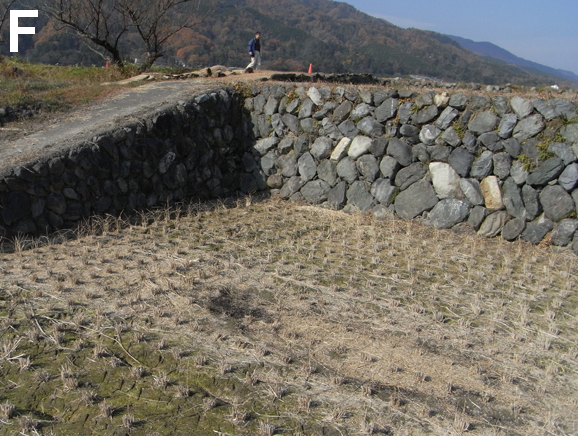
Photo of habitat of rice paddy field (in dry season). It is inhabited by Oncomelania hupensis nosophora, which is a seasonally amphibious species.

It is seasonally amphibious species which lives in lakes and on marshy ground.

The habitats of Oncomelania hupensis in the middle and lower reaches of the Yangtze River include lake/marshland regions and hill regions, both of which have extensive physical connections with the Yangtze River through channels or in low floodplains beside the Yangtze River. With frequent floodings of the Yangtze River, snails in these habitats can be dispersed and subsequently deposited widely in various localities. The accumulation of mixed sources of snails can then generate genetically diversified populations of snails, leading to the existence of various haplotypes.

In Sichuan and Yunnan provinces in the upper reaches of the Yangtze River, Oncomelania hupensis robertsoni are distributed in mountainous areas, and are not subjected to flood influence as much as in the middle and lower reaches of the river. It is interesting to see that a relatively lower number of haplotypes were found in this region as compared with Oncomelania hupensis hupensis. It appears likely that there has been certain degree of isolation for these mountainous populations.

== Parasites ==
This freshwater snail is significant medically, because it is an important vector of parasitic infection in the tropics and subtropics. It can serve as vectors for two serious human diseases: the schistosomiasis blood fluke parasite, and the paragonimus lung fluke parasites.

Oncomelania hupensis is the unique intermediate host of Schistosoma japonicum, which causes schistosomiasis endemic in the Far East, and especially in mainland China. Oncomelania hupensis largely determines the parasite's geographical range. Disinfesting Oncomelania hupensis, Japan has completely overcome Schistosoma japonicum.

== See also ==
- Oncomelania hupensis quadrasi is synonymous with Oncomelania quadrasi (Davis, 1968). It is endemic in the Philippines.
