= Gammatricula =

Scientific classification
- Kingdom: Animalia
- Phylum: Mollusca
- Class: Gastropoda
- Subclass: Caenogastropoda
- Order: Littorinimorpha
- Family: Pomatiopsidae
- Genus: Gammatricula; Davis & Liu in Davis, Liu & Chen, 1990

Diversity
- 4 species (at least)

Genus of gastropods

Gammatricula is a genus of freshwater snails which have a gill and an operculum, gastropod mollusks or micromollusks in the family Pomatiopsidae.

== Distribution ==
The distribution of Gammatricula includes China.

== Species ==
Species within the genus Gammatricula include:

- Gammatricula chinensis ..., 1990
- Gammatricula fujianensis (Liu, Zhang & Wang, 1983)
- Gammatricula shini (Habe, 1961)
- Gammatricula songi Davis, Chen & Yu, 1994
