= Tomichia natalensis =

Conservation status
- Critically Endangered (IUCN 3.1)

Scientific classification
- Kingdom: Animalia
- Phylum: Mollusca
- Class: Gastropoda
- Subclass: Caenogastropoda
- Order: Littorinimorpha
- Family: Tomichiidae
- Genus: Tomichia
- Species: T. natalensis

Binomial name
- Tomichia natalensis Connolly, 1939

Species of gastropod

Tomichia natalensis is a species of very small freshwater snails which have a gill and an operculum, gastropod molluscs or micromolluscs in the family Tomichiidae.

This species is endemic to South Africa.
