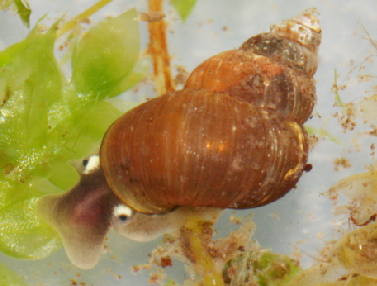
- A live individual of Fukuia multistriata

Scientific classification
- Domain: Eukaryota
- Kingdom: Animalia
- Phylum: Mollusca
- Class: Gastropoda
- Subclass: Caenogastropoda
- Order: Littorinimorpha
- Family: Pomatiopsidae
- Genus: Fukuia; Abbott & Hunter, 1949

Diversity
- 3 species and "Fukuia" ooyagii

= Fukuia =

Genus of gastropods

Fukuia is a genus of amphibious freshwater snails and land snails with an operculum, gastropod mollusks in the family Pomatiopsidae.

== Distribution ==
The genus Fukuia is endemic to Honshu, Japan. These snails occur especially in the northern and western part of Japan, on the coast of the Sea of Japan. There is a unique climate in the Sea of Japan with high precipitation due to winter snowfall in the area of distribution of Fukuia. These snails have been described as a "Japan Sea element".

Map showing hypothesized paleodistribution of the genus Fukuia (Fukuia integra, Fukuia kurodai and Fukuia multistriata) in the Early Miocene (23-18 Ma).

Map showing hypothesized paleodistribution of the genus Fukuia in the Middle Pliocene to Late Pliocene (3.5-2 Ma).

== Species ==
Species within the genus Fukuia include:

- Fukuia integra (Pilsbry, 1924) - synonym: Blanfordia integra Pilsbry, 1924, terrestrial
- Fukuia kurodai Abbott & Hunter, 1949 - type species, amphibious
  - Fukuia kurodai kurodai Abbott & Hunter, 1949
  - Fukuia kurodai niigataensis Minato, 1973
- Fukuia multistriata Abbott & Hunter, 1949 - amphibious

The speciation of genus Fukuia likely started around 7.2 million years ago in the Late Miocene.

Unassigned to genus:

- Fukuia ooyagii Minato, 1982 - Aquatic species Fukuia ooyagii should be separated from Fukuia, and its generic assignment should be determined coupled with the investigation of its soft-part morphology.

== Ecology ==
Fukuia kurodai and Fukuia multistriata live amphibiously around rocky walls of steep valleys covered with ferns and bryophytes, and moistened by dripping water. They live only along the mountain streamlets where such habitats are typically found, and often occur with pleurocerid freshwater snails.

Fukuia integra lives as a terrestrial snail in inland forests.
