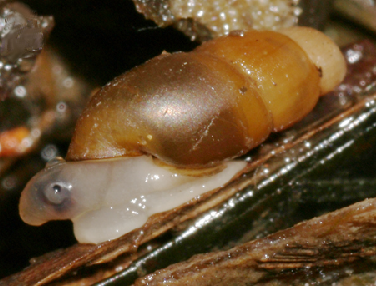
- A live individual of Cecina manchurica

Scientific classification
- Kingdom: Animalia
- Phylum: Mollusca
- Class: Gastropoda
- Subclass: Caenogastropoda
- Order: Littorinimorpha
- Family: Pomatiopsidae
- Genus: Cecina; A. Adams, 1861

Diversity
- 8 species

= Cecina (gastropod) =

Genus of sea snails

Cecina is a genus of sea snails which have a gill and an operculum, gastropod mollusks or micromollusks in the family Pomatiopsidae.

They live in shallow waters in littoral and supralittoral habitats.

== Distribution ==
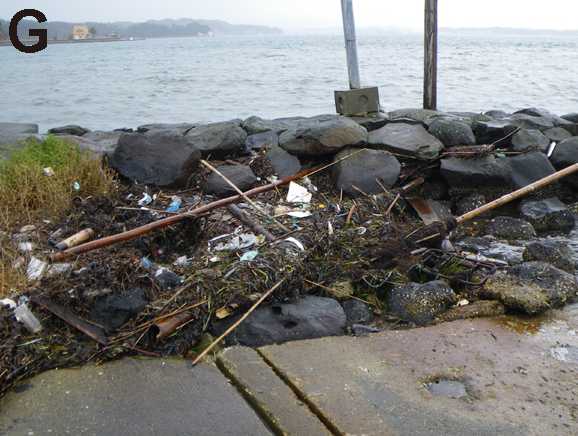
The habitat of Cecina manchurica includes decaying seaweed stranded on the beach.

The distribution of the genus Cecina includes the Sea of Japan in Primorsky Krai, Russia, Japan and Washington state, USA.

== Species ==
In 1861, Arthur Adams described the genus Cecina as a monotypic genus with Cecina manchurica as the only species. The current classification of Cecina follows Davis (1979) and other authors.

In 1996, Larisa A. Prozorova reviewed the genus, described 6 new species of Cecina and re-established Cecina tatarica as a separate species.

There are eight species within the genus Cecina:

- Cecina alta Prozorova, 1996
- Cecina elenae Prozorova, 1996
- Cecina kunashirica Prozorova, 1996
- Cecina manchurica A. Adams, 1861 - type species
- Cecina murshudovi Prozorova, 1996
- Cecina satrae Prozorova, 1996
- Cecina scarlatoi Prozorova, 1996
- Cecina tatarica (Schrenck, 1867)
