= Schistosoma japonicum =

Scientific classification
- Kingdom: Animalia
- Phylum: Platyhelminthes
- Class: Trematoda
- Order: Diplostomida
- Family: Schistosomatidae
- Genus: Schistosoma
- Species: S. japonicum

Binomial name
- Schistosoma japonicum (Katsurada, 1904)

Species of fluke

Schistosoma japonicum is an important parasite and one of the major infectious agents of schistosomiasis. This parasite has a very wide host range, infecting at least 31 species of wild mammals, including nine carnivores, 16 rodents, one primate (human), two insectivores and three artiodactyls and therefore it can be considered a true zoonosis. Travelers should be well-aware of where this parasite might be a problem and how to prevent the infection. S. japonicum occurs in the Far East, such as China, the Philippines, Indonesia and Southeast Asia.

== Discovery ==
Schistosoma japonicum was discovered in Kofu basin by Fujiro Katsurada, a pathologist in Okayama University in 1904. Later, Katsurada named the parasite Schistosoma japonicum.

== Social impacts ==
Individuals at risk to infection from S. japonicum are farmers who often wade in their irrigation water, fishermen who wade in streams and lakes, children who play in water, and people who wash clothes in streams.

Important factors to influence transmission are age, sex of an individual, as well as the economic and educational level of a population. Males show the highest rates of infection, as well as the most intense infections. This may be due to occupational risk. As was the case of Suriname, the highest prevalence occurs in both sexes where both male and females work in fields.

Climate change may have potential impact on the transmission of schistosomiasis in China. The development of S. japonicum in the intermediate host Oncomelania hupensis occurred at the threshold of 15.4 °C. Previously, O. hupensis has been restricted to areas where the mean January temperature has been over 0 °C. With rising climate change, it is predicted that by 2050, O. hupensis will be able to cover 8.1% of the surface area of China, thus leading to greater concern to new populations being at risk to schistosomiasis.

== Morphology ==
The S. japonicum worms are yellow or yellow-brown. The males of this species are slightly larger than the other schistosomes and they measure ≈1.2 cm by 0.5 mm. The females measure 2 cm by 0.4 mm. The adult worms are longer and narrower than the related S. mansoni worms.

By electron microscopy there are no bosses or spines on the dorsal surface of the male, which is ridged and presents a spongy appearance. Many spines cover the inner surface of the oral sucker and extend to the pharyngeal opening. The oral sucker shows a rim with spines of variable size and sharpness inward and outward from the rim. The ventral sucker possesses many spines which are smaller than in the oral sucker. The lining of the gynecophoric canal is roughened by minute spines. The integument of the female is ridged and pitted and possesses fewer spines than in the oral sucker, the ventral sucker, and the gynecophoric canal of the male. Anterior to the acetabulum, the integumental surfaces are devoid of spines. However, in the other areas, spines are equally distributed except for the vicinity of the excretory pore.

The ova are about 55–85 μm by 40–60 μm, oval with a minute lateral spine or knob.

== Life cycle ==
The life cycles of Schistosoma japonicum and Schistosoma mansoni are very similar. In brief, eggs of the parasite are released in the feces and if they come in contact with water they hatch into free-swimming larva, called miracidia. The larva then has to infect a snail of the genus Oncomelania such as species of Oncomelania hupensis within one or two days. Inside the snail, the larva undergo asexual reproduction through a series of stages called sporocysts. After the asexual reproduction stage cercaria (another free-swimming larva) are generated in large quantities, which then leave (shed into the environment) the snail and must infect a suitable vertebrate host. Once the cercaria penetrates the skin of the host it loses its tail and becomes a schistosomule. The worms then migrate through the circulation ending at the mesenteric veins where they mate and start laying eggs. Each pair deposits around 1500–3500 eggs per day in the vessels of the intestinal wall. The eggs infiltrate through the tissues and are passed in the feces.

== Hosts ==
Hosts include cattle, water buffalo, and certain other mammal species, some of which may be important for maintaining parasite transmission toward humans.

== Pathology ==
Once the parasite has entered the body and begun to produce eggs, it uses the hosts' immune system (granulomas) for transportation of eggs into the gut. The eggs stimulate formation of granuloma around them. The granulomas, consisting of motile cells, carry the eggs to the intestinal lumen. When in the lumen, granuloma cells disperse leaving the eggs to be excreted within feces. Unfortunately, about two-thirds of eggs are not excreted, instead they build up in the gut. Chronic infection can lead to characteristic Symmer's fibrosis (also known as "clay pipe stem" fibroses, these occur due to intrahepatic portal vein calcification which assume the shape of a clay pipe in cross section). S. japonicum is the most pathogenic of the schistosoma species because it produces up to 3,000 eggs per day, ten times greater than that of S. mansoni.

As a chronic disease, S. japonicum can lead to liver fibrosis, liver cirrhosis, liver portal hypertension, splenomegaly, and ascites. Some eggs may pass the liver and enter lungs, nervous system and other organs where they can adversely affect the health of the infected individual.

== Disease ==
Schistosoma japonicum is the only human blood fluke that occurs in China, Philippines, and Sri Lanka. It is one of the parasitic species responsible for schistosomiasis, a disease that still remains a significant health problem especially in lake and marshland regions. Schistosomiasis is an infection caused mainly by three schistosome species; Schistosoma mansoni, Schistosoma japonicum and Schistosoma haematobium. S. japonicum being the most infectious of the three species. Infection by schistosomes is followed by an acute Katayama fever. Historical accounts of Katayama disease dates back to the discovery of S. Japonicum in Japan in 1904. The disease was named after an area it was endemic to, Katayama district, Hiroshima, Japan. If left untreated, it will develop into a chronic condition characterized by hepatosplenic disease and impaired physical and cognitive development. The severity of S. japonicum arises in 60% of all neurological diseases in schistosomes due to the migration of schistosome eggs to the brain. Symptoms an infected person might experience include: fever, cough, abdominal pain, diarrhea, hepatosplenomegaly and eosinophilia.

== Diagnosis ==
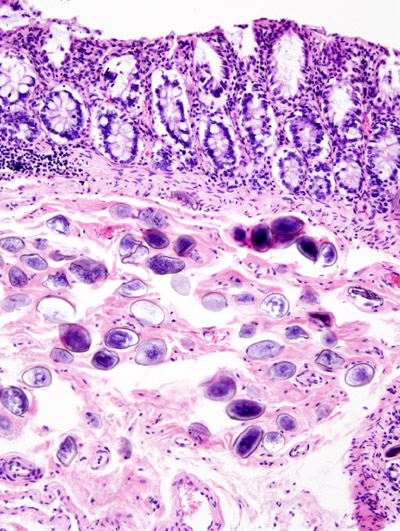
Histopathological image of old state of schistosomiasis incidentally found at autopsy. The deposition of calcified eggs in the colonic submucosa suggests prior infection of Schistosoma japonicum.

Microscopic identification of eggs in stool or urine is the most practical method for diagnosis. Stool examination should be performed when infection with S. mansoni or S. japonicum is suspected, and urine examination should be performed if S. haematobium is suspected.

Eggs can be present in the stool in infections with all Schistosoma species. The examination can be performed on a simple smear (1 to 2 mg of fecal material). Since eggs may be passed intermittently or in small amounts, their detection will be enhanced by repeated examinations and/or concentration procedures (such as the formalin – ethyl acetate technique). In addition, for field surveys and investigational purposes, the egg output can be quantified by using the Kato-Katz technique (20 to 50 mg of fecal material) or the Ritchie technique.

Eggs can be found in the urine in infections with S. haematobium (recommended time for collection: between noon and 3 PM) and with S. japonicum. Detection will be enhanced by centrifugation and examination of the sediment. Quantification is possible by using filtration through a nucleopore membrane of a standard volume of urine followed by egg counts on the membrane. Tissue biopsy (rectal biopsy for all species and biopsy of the bladder for S. haematobium) may demonstrate eggs when stool or urine examinations are negative.

Since the eggs of S. japonicum are small, concentration techniques may be required. Biopsies are mostly performed to test for chronic schistosomiasis with no eggs. An ELISA test can be performed to test for antibodies specific to schistosomes. A positive result indicates a present or recent infection (within the past two years). Ultrasonographic examination can be performed to assess the extent of hepatic and spleen-related morbidity. The problems with immunodiagnostic methods are that 1) It is only positive a certain time after infection 2) They can cross interact with other helminthes infections.

== Treatment ==
The therapy of choice is praziquantel, a quinolone derivative. Praziquantel is generally administered in an oral form in one or two doses from 40 to 60 mg/kg body weight.

Combination treatment may prevent morbidity due to schistosomiasis. Praziquantel is most active against adult worms. However, it has been found that artemether prevents the development of adult worms, thus decreasing egg production in the host. If both praziquantel and artemether can be used together, the entire lifespan of S. japonicum would be covered in the vertebrate host.

== Prevention ==
Human waste should be hygienically disposed of. Human waste in water with the Oncomelania snail intermediate host is a major cause to the perpetuation of schistosomiasis. To prevent this from occurring, human waste should never be used for nightsoiling (fertilization of crops with human waste) and unsanitary conditions should be improved. To avoid infection, individuals should avoid contact with water (including swimming and walking through water) that is contaminated by human or animal waste, especially water sources that are endemic to Oncomelania snails.

Other important prevention techniques include: drinking purchased mineral water from stores and boiling water on high temperature for at least one minute before it would be used for drinking or bathing. Iodine treatment does not guarantee the safety of the water.

If necessary to enter potentially infected water, cercarial repellents and cercaricidal ointments can be applied to the skin before entering the water. Barrier cream with a dimethicone base offered high levels of protection for at least 48 hours.

The search for a practical vaccine continues and could greatly benefit affected areas.

== Control ==
Control against infection of S. japonicum requires multiple efforts consisting of education, eliminating the disease from infected individuals, controlling the vector.

Education can be highly effective, but difficult in countries with limited resources. Additionally, asking people to change customs, traditions and behaviors can prove a difficult task.

Controlling S. japonicum with molluscicide has proved ineffective because Oncomelania snails are amphibious and only frequent water to lay their eggs.
