= Pomatiopsis =

Scientific classification
- Kingdom: Animalia
- Phylum: Mollusca
- Class: Gastropoda
- Subclass: Caenogastropoda
- Order: Littorinimorpha
- Family: Pomatiopsidae
- Genus: Pomatiopsis; Tryon, 1862

Type species
- Cyclostoma lapidaria Say, 1817

Synonyms
- Chilocyclus Gill, 1863 (invalid: junior homonym of Chilocyclus Bronn, 1851)

Genus of gastropods

Pomatiopsis is a genus of amphibious snails with gills and an operculum, aquatic freshwater gastropod mollusks in the family Pomatiopsidae.

Pomatiopsis is the type genus of the family Pomatiopsidae.

== Distribution ==
The distribution of the genus Pomatiopsis includes the USA: West Coast of the United States, Midwestern United States and Eastern United States.

== Description ==
In 1862, the American malacologist George Washington Tryon first defined this genus. Tryon's diagnosis reads as follows:

Shell elongate, the spire (of about six whorls) much exceeding the length of the aperture.

== Species ==
There are four species within the genus Pomatiopsis:

- Pomatiopsis binneyi Tryon, 1863
- Pomatiopsis californica Pilsbry, 1899
- Pomatiopsis chacei Pilsbry, 1937
- Pomatiopsis cincinnatiensis (Lea, 1840)
- Pomatiopsis hinkleyi Pilsbry, 1896
- Pomatiopsis lapidaria (Say, 1817) - type species

== Ecology ==
Species in the genus Pomatiopsis are amphibious, living in humid habitats, on marshy ground and in periodically flooded soil (Pomatiopsis californica and Pomatiopsis lapidaria), in trickling water (Pomatiopsis binneyi) and on mud of streams (Pomatiopsis cincinnatiensis).
