= Tham Kong Lo =

Cave in Laos

Coordinates: 17.9564°N 104.7611°E

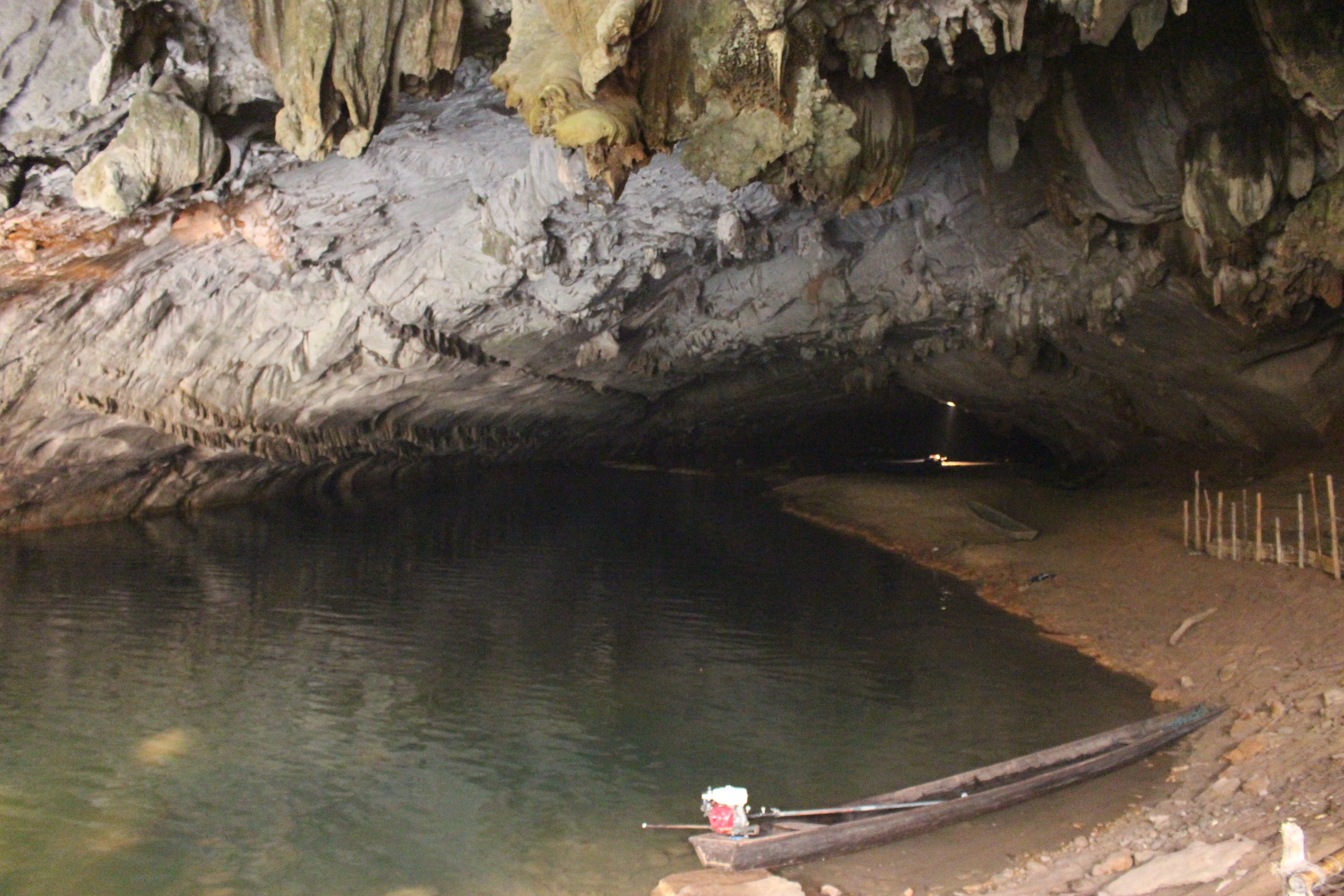
Northwestern entrance of the cave

Tham Kong Lo or Kong Lor Cave is a karst limestone cave in Phu Hin Bun National Park, in Khammouane Province, Laos. It is located roughly 130 kilometres (81 mi) north of Thakhek, on the Nam Hin Bun River, which flows into the cave. The karst formation is dramatic and the cave has been cited as a "one of Southeast Asia's geological wonders".

The cave is deep (lasting about 7 kilometres (4.3 mi)) and passages are up to 90m wide and 100m high in parts. The locals in recent years have set up vendors at the location to provide to tourists. Inside the cave is a pool which glows a bright emerald colour which locals hold as sacred, believing it to reflect the skin of the Hindi god Indra.

The first rowing crossing of the cave took place in 1920, when five volunteers undertook an expedition using a rowboat lit by traditional torches with limited autonomy. Their successful passage revealed a new route, although it was only exploited much later.

After the discovery of the passage between Konglor and Natane, fear of entering the cave persisted for a long time. Villagers wishing to travel between the two settlements did so on foot, following a difficult 6- to 7-hour route that crossed five mountain passes.

The Natane Valley was formed over millions of years as water carved a 7.5-kilometre passage through the karst. It is a remote and fragile valley whose inhabitants adapt their livelihoods to the rhythm of the rainy seasons. During the monsoon period, some villages live in self-sufficiency. Rice, tobacco, and tourism constitute the main sources of income for the local population. The area contains several interwoven ecosystems that host endemic species of flora and fauna, some of which are endangered.
