= Tomichia =

Scientific classification
- Kingdom: Animalia
- Phylum: Mollusca
- Class: Gastropoda
- Subclass: Caenogastropoda
- Order: Littorinimorpha
- Family: Tomichiidae
- Genus: Tomichia; Benson, 1851

Diversity
- 11 species

Genus of gastropods

Tomichia is a genus of very small freshwater snails which have a gill and an operculum, gastropod molluscs or micromolluscs in the family Tomichiidae.

== Distribution ==
The distribution of the genus Tomichia includes South Africa and Eastern Zaire. Tomichia is the only genus of Pomatiopsidae in Africa.

== Ecology ==
This genus occurs is both freshwater and brackish water. There exist halophilic species of Tomichia which live in saline lakes such as Tomichia ventricosa.

== Species ==
Brown (1994) recognized 10 species (7 in South Africa and 3 in Central Africa) and one undescribed species. Kameda & Kato (2011) recognized 11 species of Tomichia.

Species within the genus Tomichia include:

- Tomichia cawstoni Connolly, 1939
- Tomichia differens Connolly, 1939
- Tomichia guillemei Leloup, 1953
- Tomichia hendrickxi (Verdcourt, 1950)
- Tomichia kivuensis Mandahl-Barth, 1974
- Tomichia natalensis Connolly, 1939
- Tomichia rogersi (Connolly, 1929)
- Tomichia tristis (Morelet, 1889) - critically endangered
- Tomichia ventricosa (Reeve, 1842) - type species
- Tomichia zwellendamensis (Küster, 1852)
- (?)Tomichia n.sp. - reported by Cohen (1986) from Lake Turkana
