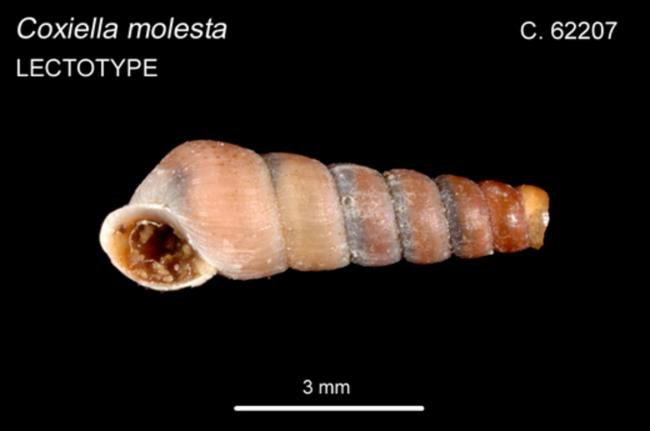
- Coxiella molesta

Scientific classification
- Domain: Bacteria
- Kingdom: Pseudomonadati
- Phylum: Pseudomonadota
- Class: Gammaproteobacteria
- Order: Legionellales
- Family: Coxiellaceae
- Genus: Coxiella; E. A. Smith, 1894

Species
- Coxiella exposita Coxiella glabra Coxiella minima Coxiella striata Coxiella striatula Coxiella pyrrhostoma Coxiella glauerti Coxiella gilesi Coxiella molesta

Diversity
- 15 species

= Coxiella (gastropod) =

Genus of gastropods

Coxiella is a genus of aquatic gastropod mollusks in the family Tomichiidae. These snails that live in saline lakes, and have gills and an operculum.

== Distribution ==
The distribution of genus Coxiella includes Tasmania and Australia: southern Australia, central Australia and northern Queensland.

== Species ==
Davis (1979) recognized 10 species (9 in Australia) and one subrecent species Coxiella badgerensis in Tasmania. However, recent phylogenetic studies have suggested that Coxiella contains at least 15 species with six species currently undescribed. Coxiella is a Gondwana relict with its most recent ancestors from South Africa (Tomichia) and South America (Idiopyrgus). Coxiella appears have diversified during previous periods of aridification on the Australian continent.

Species within the genus Coxiella include:

subgenus Coxiella

- † Coxiella badgerensis (Johnston, 1879) - subrecent
- Coxiella exposita Iredale, 1943
- Coxiella glabra MacPherson, 1957
- Coxiella glauertii MacPherson, 1954
- Coxiella minima MacPherson, 1954
- Coxiella molesta Iredale, 1943
- Coxiella pyrrhostoma (Cox, 1868)
- Coxiella striata (Reeve, 1842)
- Coxiella striatula (Menke, 1843) - type species

subgenus Coxielladda Iredale & Whitley, 1938

- Coxiella gilesi (Angas, 1877)

== Ecology ==
This genus consists of halophilic species which occur in temporal and permanent saline lakes. Recently ecological studies have suggested that although all Coxiella species can tolerate a broad range of salinities that some species can tolerate significantly higher salinities than others.

Coxiella snails are iteroparous. When the saline lake dries out, adults of Coxiella are able to survive.
