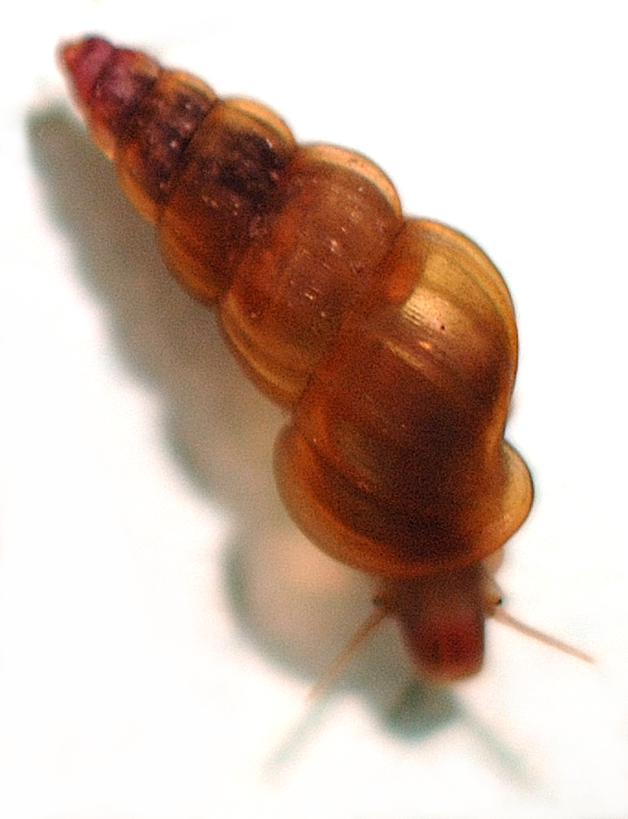
- Oncomelania hupensis

Scientific classification
- Kingdom: Animalia
- Phylum: Mollusca
- Class: Gastropoda
- Subclass: Caenogastropoda
- Order: Littorinimorpha
- Family: Pomatiopsidae
- Subfamily: Pomatiopsinae
- Genus: Oncomelania; Gredler, 1881

Diversity
- 2 species

= Oncomelania =

Genus of gastropods

Oncomelania is a genus of very small tropical freshwater snails, aquatic gastropod mollusks in the family Pomatiopsidae.

These Oncomelania snails are distantly related to the marine periwinkle, and more closely related to the small marine snails of the family Rissoidae.

== Species ==
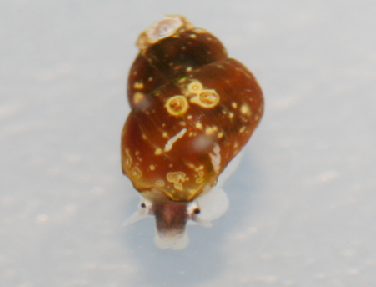
Oncomelania minima

There are two species in the genus Oncomelania:

- Oncomelania hupensis Gredler, 1881 - type species, this polytypic species has a number of subspecies
- Oncomelania minima P. Bartsch, 1936

Woodruff et al. (1999) recognized also the following species:

- Oncomelania lindoensis Davis & Carney, 1973 - from Lake Lindu (Lore Lindu National Park), Sulawesi

Japanese Red List Data Book (2006) recognizes also the following additional species:

- Oncomelania shini - as Vulnerable species in Japan
- Oncomelania sakuyamai - with no conservation status evaluated in Japan

== Distribution ==
This genus has not yet become established in the US, but it is considered to represent a potentially serious threat as a pest, an invasive species which could negatively affect agriculture, natural ecosystems, human health or commerce. Therefore, it has been suggested that this species be given top national quarantine significance in the USA.

== Evolution ==
About the origin and evolution history of Oncomelania, Davis (1979) proposed a Gondwanan origin for the Pomatiopsidae, with rafting to mainland Asia via the Indian Craton after break-up of Gondwanan and colonization of South-East Asia and China. It is hypothesized that Oncomelania snails, arrived in southwestern China from Indian before the second (major) Tibetan orogeny (2.5 Ma), then evolved and spread down their respective river systems, to mainland of China, Indonesia and Philippines. Although mutation rate calibrations using fossil data is impossible here, many studies have demonstrated the confidence that molecular data can provide reasonable estimates of divergence time. Data by Zhao et al. (2010) suggested that the two subspecies of Oncomelania hupensis began to diverse as early about 2–6 Ma based on the invertebrate ITS substitution rate range. Zhao et al. (2010) did not find any strong molecular and fossil evidences about Oncomelania evolution, but the reported Oncomelania fossil found in Guangxi (1 Ma) by Nils Hjalmar Odhner in 1930 and geological movement make this diversification time reasonable. It provides a new insight into the Oncomelania evolution history although the substitution rate needs to be verified with new fossil and molecular data in future study.

== Parasites ==
Various Oncomelania species are significant medically, because they can serve as vectors for two serious human diseases: they can carry the schistosomiasis blood fluke parasite, and the paragonimus lung fluke parasites.

The miracidia reproduce asexually through sporocyst stages within these intermediate hosts, resulting in the production of many free-swimming cercariae.

Research conducted in the 1950s by Chinese parasitologist and Harvard graduate Chen Xintao from revealed infection rates as high as 31.1% in Guangdong Province, China. In response, a government initiative focused on filling ditches and eliminating breeding grounds for Oncomelania snails led to significant improvements in controlling the schistosomiasis epidemic.

== Human consumption ==
Oncomelania species are still commonly consumed throughout China.

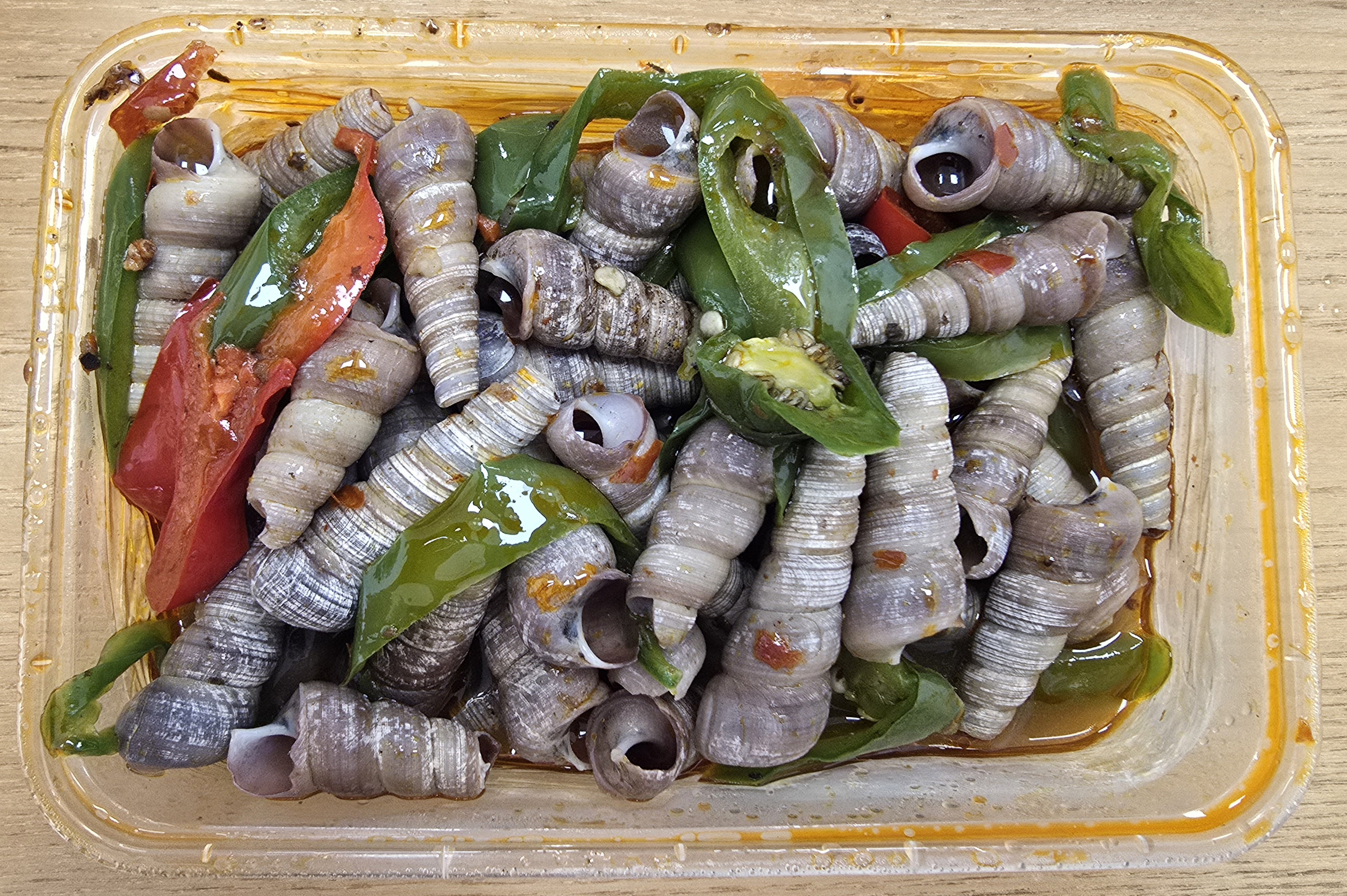
Cooked Oncomelania snail species
