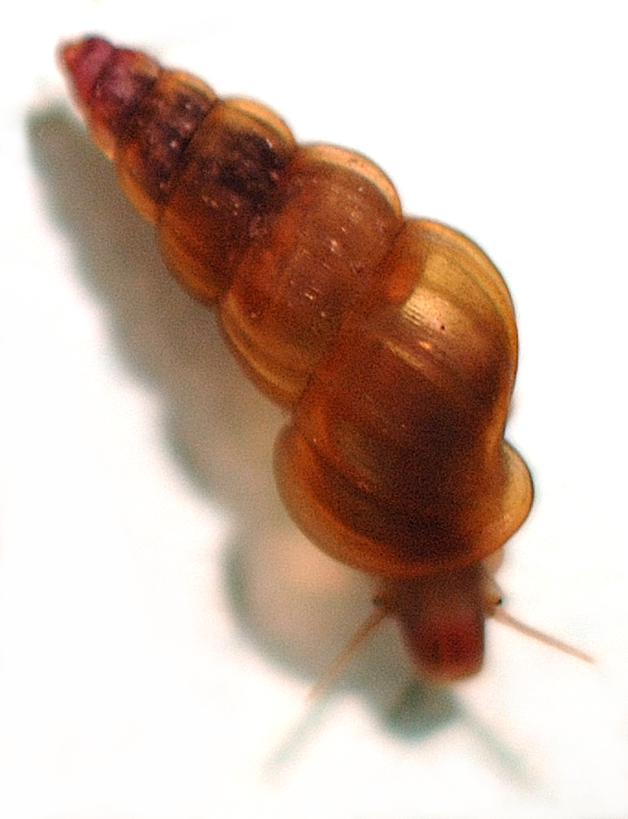
- A live individual of Oncomelania hupensis

Scientific classification
- Kingdom: Animalia
- Phylum: Mollusca
- Class: Gastropoda
- Subclass: Caenogastropoda
- Order: Littorinimorpha
- Superfamily: Truncatelloidea
- Family: Pomatiopsidae; Stimpson, 1865

= Pomatiopsidae =

Family of gastropods

Pomatiopsidae is a family of small, mainly freshwater snails, (some also occur in other habitats) that have gills and an operculum, aquatic gastropod mollusks in the superfamily Truncatelloidea (according to the taxonomy of the Gastropoda by Bouchet & Rocroi, 2005).

Pomatiopsidae are well known as intermediate hosts of Asian schistosomes.

== Distribution ==
Species in the family Pomatiopsidae occur worldwide. The generic diversity of Pomatiopsinae is particularly high in the Japanese archipelago, where four of the eight genera, including two endemics, are recorded. The subfamily Triculinae radiated as aquatic snails in freshwater habitats in Southeast Asia.

Approximate distribution map of Pomatiopsidae. Notes: Distribution of Tomichia includes also Central Africa, Cecina has eight species.

== Description ==
The American malacologist William Stimpson first defined this taxon as Pomatiopsinae in 1865. Stimpson's diagnosis reads as follows:

Pomatiopsinae, with the shell and operculum as in the Rissoinae. Foot with lateral sinuses. Size small. Amphibious. Genus Pomatiopsis, Tryon.

== Subfamilies ==
The family Pomatiopsidae consists of 2 subfamilies (according to the taxonomy of the Gastropoda by Bouchet & Rocroi, 2005) that follows classification by Davis (1979):

- Subfamily Pomatiopsinae Stimpson, 1865 - synonyms: Hemibiinae Heude, 1890; Tomichiinae Wenz, 1938; Coxiellidae Iredale, 1943; Oncomelaniidae Salisbury & Edwards, 1961; Cecininae Starobogatov, 1983
- Subfamily Triculinae Annandale, 1924
  - tribe Triculuni Annandale, 1924 - synonym: Delavayidae Annandale, 1924
  - tribe Jullieniini Davis, 1979
  - tribe Lacunopsini Davis, 1979
  - tribe Pachydrobiini Davis & Kang, 1990

Family-group name Rehderiellinae Brandt, 1974 is also in Pomatiopsidae, but it is not allocated in detail.

== Genera ==
Genera within the family Pomatiopsidae include:

- Spiripockia Simone, 2012 (not allocated to a subfamily)

Subfamily Pomatiopsinae

- Blanfordia Adams, 1863
- Cecina A. Adams, 1861
- Coxiella E. A. Smith, 1894: belongs in the family Tomichiidae
- Floridiscrobs Pilsbry and McGinty, 1949
- Fukuia Abbott & Hunter, 1949
- Hemibia Heude, 1890 (species type: Oncomelania hupensis Gredler, 1881
- Idiopyrgus Pilsbry, 1911 - synonym: Aquidauania Davis, 1979: belongs in the family Tomichiidae
- Oncomelania Gredler, 1881
- Pomatiopsis Tryon, 1862 - the type genus of the family Pomatiopsidae
- Tomichia Benson, 1851: belongs in the family Tomichiidae

Subfamily Triculinae - there are over 20 genera in Triculinae

tribe Triculuni

- Delavaya Heude, 1889
- Fenouilia Heude, 1889
- Lithoglyphopsis Thiele, 1928
- Tricula Benson, 1843 - type genus of the tribe Triculuni

tribe Jullieniini

- Hubendickia Brandt, 1968
- Hydrorissoia Bavay, 1895
- Jullienia Crosse & P. Fischer, 1876 - type genus of the tribe Jullieniini
- Karelainia Davis, 1979
- Kunmingia Davis & Kuo in Davis, 1981
- Neoprososthenia Davis & Kuo in Davis, Kuo, Hoagland, Chen, Yang & Chen, 1984
- Pachydrobiella Thiele, 1928 - with the only species Pachydrobiella brevis (Bavay, 1895)
- † Paraprososthenia Annandale, 1919
- Saduniella Brandt, 1970 - with the only species Saduniella planispira Brandt, 1970

tribe Lacunopsini

- Lacunopsis Deshayes, 1876 - type genus of the tribe Lacunopsini

tribe Pachydrobiini

- Gammatricula Davis & Liu in Davis, Liu & Chen, 1990
- Halewisia Davis, 1979 - with the only species Halewisia expansa (Brandt, 1970)
- Jinghongia Davis in Davis & Kang, 1990
- Neotricula Davis in Davis, Subba Rao & Hoagland, 1986
- Pachydrobia Crosse & P. Fischer, 1876 - type genus of the tribe Pachydrobiini
- Robertsiella Davis & Greer, 1980
- Wuconchona Kang, 1983

Rehderiellinae is not allocated to a subfamily

- Rehderiella Brandt, 1974 - type genus of the taxon Rehderiellinae

== Ecology ==
The Pomatiopsidae have various life habits: aquatic, amphibious, littoral, halophilic, cavernicolous and even terrestrial. Terrestrial taxa occur only on the Japanese Archipelago located in East Asia (Blanfordia). Tomichia and Coxiella include several halophilic species occurring on saline lakes.

Pomatiopsidae invaded freshwater habitats from marine ones in one or in two independent lineages. They also invaded terrestrial habitats from freshwater habitats in two independent lineages.

Overview of diversity and habitat of genera in Pomatiopsidae:
Genus	Number of species	Habitat
Blanfordia	3	terrestrial
Cecina	8	littoral of the sea
Coxiella	10 (one of them extinct)	saline lakes
Fukuia	3	terrestrial and freshwater, amphibious, often arboreal
"Fukuia" ooyagii - unassigned to genus	1	freshwater
Hemibia	??	??
Idiopyrgus	1-3 species	freshwater
Oncomelania	2	freshwater, marshy ground, seasonally amphibious
Pomatiopsis	4	marshy ground, amphibious
Tomichia	11	freshwater, brackish, saline lakes
Delavaya	?	?
Fenouilia	?	freshwater
Lithoglyphopsis	?	?
Tricula	15-20+	freshwater
Hubendickia	16	?
Hydrorissoia	7	?
Jullienia	10	?
Karelainia	4	?
Kunmingia	?	?
Neoprososthenia	?	?
Pachydrobiella	1	?
† Paraprososthenia		fossil, freshwater lake beds
Saduniella	1	?
Lacunopsis	12	?
Gammatricula	4	?
Halewisia	1	?
Jinghongia	?	?
Neotricula	2 (at least)	freshwater
Pachydrobia	10	?
Robertsiella	3	freshwater, streams
Wuconchona	?	?
Rehderiella	?	?
Spiripockia	1	cavernicolous
