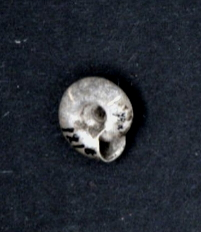
- Shell of Aegista congener (specimen at Naturalis Biodiversity Center)

Scientific classification
- Kingdom: Animalia
- Phylum: Mollusca
- Class: Gastropoda
- Order: Stylommatophora
- Family: Camaenidae
- Subfamily: Bradybaeninae
- Tribe: Aegistini
- Genus: Aegista
- Species: A. congener

Binomial name
- Aegista congener Preston, 1914

Synonyms
- Aegista (Aegista) congener Preston, 1914 (no subgenera are recognized)

= Aegista congener =

Species of gastropod

Aegista congener is a species of air-breathing land snails, a terrestrial pulmonate gastropod in the family Camaenidae.

== Description ==
The diameter of the shell attains 12 mm, its height 7 mm.

The shell of this species deviates from Aegista mitanensis (Godwin-Austen, 1889), notably in its broader, less elevated shape, accompanied by a smoother, less pronounced angle at the periphery, and a significantly wider umbilicus.

== Distribution ==
This species occurs in Assam, India.
