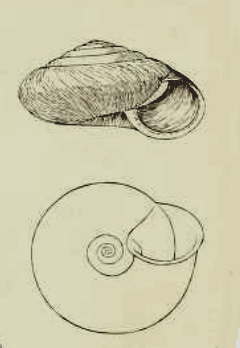
- Shell of Aegista proxima (holotype)

Scientific classification
- Kingdom: Animalia
- Phylum: Mollusca
- Class: Gastropoda
- Order: Stylommatophora
- Family: Camaenidae
- Genus: Aegista
- Species: A. proxima

Binomial name
- Aegista proxima (Pilsbry & Y. Hirase, 1909)

Synonyms
- Eulota (Aegista) proxima Pilsbry & Y. Hirase, 1909 (original combination)

= Aegista proxima =

Species of gastropod

Aegista proxima is a species of air-breathing land snails, a terrestrial pulmonate gastropod in the family Camaenidae.

== Description ==
The diameter of the shell attains 15 mm, its height 8.3mm.

This shell closely resembles Aegista friedeliana from Kyushu. It features an open umbilicus, a low conical spire, and an obtuse, subangular periphery. The surface is sculptured with rather weak, irregular growth striae and covered with a smooth brownish-yellow cuticle, lacking any scaly or thread-like appendages. The whorls increase very slowly, with the body whorl very slightly deflexed at the aperture. The oblique aperture is rounded-lunate, and the peristome is expanded, with the outer and basal margins narrowly reflexed.

== Distribution ==
This species occurs in Korea.
