= Aegista taiwanica =

Scientific classification
- Kingdom: Animalia
- Phylum: Mollusca
- Class: Gastropoda
- Order: Stylommatophora
- Family: Camaenidae
- Genus: Aegista
- Species: A. taiwanica

Binomial name
- Aegista taiwanica Kuroda, 1941
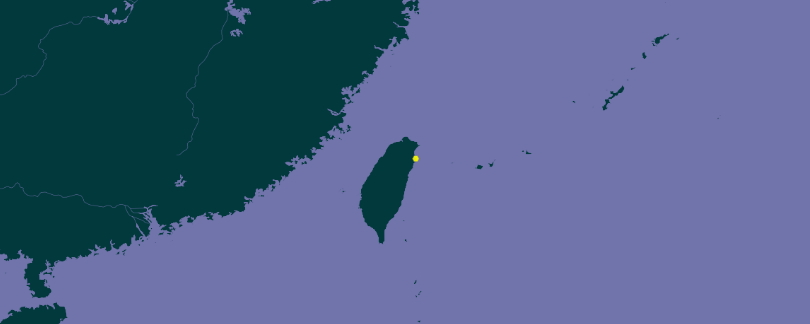

Synonyms
- Aegista (Plectotropis) taiwanica Kuroda, 1941 (basionym)

Species of gastropod

Aegista taiwanica is a species of air-breathing land snails, a terrestrial pulmonate gastropod in the family Camaenidae.

== Distribution ==
This species occurs in Taiwan.
