= Aegista laoyelingensis =

Scientific classification
- Domain: Eukaryota
- Kingdom: Animalia
- Phylum: Mollusca
- Class: Gastropoda
- Order: Stylommatophora
- Family: Camaenidae
- Genus: Aegista
- Species: A. laoyelingensis

Binomial name
- Aegista laoyelingensis L. Zhang, 1993

Species of gastropod

Aegista laoyelingensis is a species of air-breathing land snails, a terrestrial pulmonate gastropod in the family Camaenidae.

== Description ==
The diameter of the shell attains 13.1 mm, its height 5.6 mm.

== Distribution ==
This shell occurs in northeastern China.
