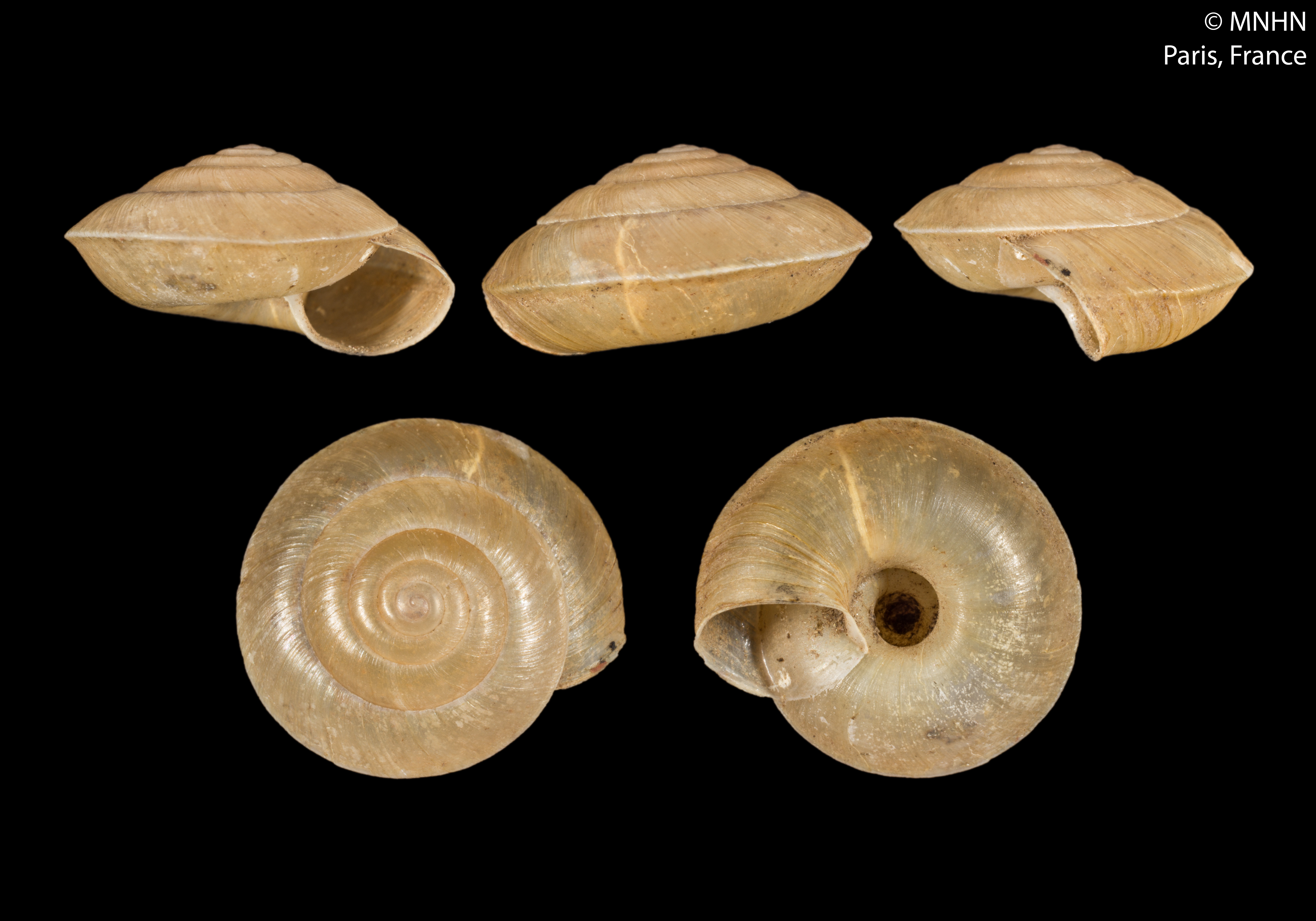
- Shell of Aegista pseudotrochula (syntype at MNHN, Paris)

Scientific classification
- Kingdom: Animalia
- Phylum: Mollusca
- Class: Gastropoda
- Order: Stylommatophora
- Family: Camaenidae
- Genus: Aegista
- Species: A. pseudotrochula

Binomial name
- Aegista pseudotrochula (Bavay & Dautzenberg, 1909)

Synonyms
- Helix (Plectotropis) pseudotrochula Bavay & Dautzenberg, 1909 (original combination); Plectotropis pseudotrochula (Bavay & Dautzenberg, 1909)

= Aegista pseudotrochula =

Species of gastropod

Aegista pseudotrochula is a species of air-breathing land snails, a terrestrial pulmonate gastropod in the family Camaenidae.

== Distribution ==
This shell occurs in Vietnam and Laos.
