= Aegista hupeana =

Scientific classification
- Domain: Eukaryota
- Kingdom: Animalia
- Phylum: Mollusca
- Class: Gastropoda
- Order: Stylommatophora
- Family: Camaenidae
- Genus: Aegista
- Species: A. hupeana

Binomial name
- Aegista hupeana (Gredler, 1886)

Synonyms
- Helix hupeana Gredler, 1886 (original combination)

Species of gastropod

Aegista hupeana is a species of air-breathing land snails, a terrestrial pulmonate gastropod in the family Camaenidae.

== Description ==
The diameter of the shell is 17 mm, its height 6 mm.

(Original description in Latin) The shell is right-handed, orbicular-discoid, and spirally depressed with a convex shape. It is thin, transparent, and features a broad umbilicus. The surface is densely but unevenly striated, shiny, and has a horny appearance. There are 6 to 6.5 rather convex whorls that gradually increase in size, with the body whorl either slightly or not at all descending. The body whorl is angled above the middle, with the angle sometimes caving in, and is cylindrical beneath. The aperture is rounded and lunar-shaped, positioned diagonally. The peristome is broadly expanded all around, reflexed, acute, and thickly lipped. The upper margin is elongated in the middle, while the lower margin is rounded and convergent, rarely connected to the fine parietal callus.

== Distribution ==
This species occurs in China.
