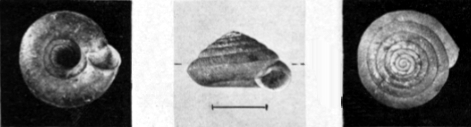
- Shell of Aegista pyramidata (holotype)

Scientific classification
- Kingdom: Animalia
- Phylum: Mollusca
- Class: Gastropoda
- Order: Stylommatophora
- Family: Camaenidae
- Subfamily: Bradybaeninae
- Tribe: Aegistini
- Genus: Aegista
- Species: A. pyramidata

Binomial name
- Aegista pyramidata (Pilsbry, 1927)

Synonyms
- Eulota (Aegista) pyramidata Pilsbry, 1927 (original combination)

= Aegista pyramidata =

Species of gastropod

Aegista pyramidata is a species of air-breathing land snails, a terrestrial pulmonate gastropod in the family Camaenidae.

== Description ==
The diameter of the shell attains 9.7 mm, its height 6.3 mm.

The shell takes on a pyramidal form with an openly visible umbilicus. it exhibits a thin, yet reasonably strong structure. Its surface lacks luster and is adorned with widely spaced cuticular processes, reminiscent of threads, scattered along growth lines, while closer to the suture and umbilicus, shorter scale-like processes are discernible, all more or less deciduous. Within the umbilicus, a fine granular texture is present. The spire maintains a conoidal shape with gently convex contours, comprising nearly 7½ convex whorls that gradually widen. The body whorl shows a slight descent towards the front and presents a rather sharp angle at the periphery, although this angle softens somewhat near the outer lip. While notably convex, the shell lacks angularity around the umbilicus. The aperture is small and rounded, with the peristome forming approximately three-fourths of a circle. Its coloration tends towards brownish hues, and it is characterized by a thin, narrowly expanded structure, with the basal margin displaying a narrow reflection.

== Distribution ==
This species occurs on Korea and Manchuria, China.
