= Aegista carinata =

Scientific classification
- Kingdom: Animalia
- Phylum: Mollusca
- Class: Gastropoda
- Order: Stylommatophora
- Family: Camaenidae
- Genus: Aegista
- Species: A. carinata

Binomial name
- Aegista carinata (Gude, 1901)

Synonyms
- Trishoplita carinata Gude, 1901 superseded combination; Trishoplita goodwinii var. carinata Gude, 1901 superseded combination (basionym)

Species of gastropod

Aegista carinata is a species of air-breathing land snails, a terrestrial pulmonate gastropod in the family Camaenidae.

== Description ==
It is more depressed than Trishoplita goodwinii (E. A. Smith, 1876) and distinctly keeled at the periphery.

== Distribution and habitat ==
This shell occurs on Shikoku Island, Japan.
