= Aegista impexa =

Scientific classification
- Kingdom: Animalia
- Phylum: Mollusca
- Class: Gastropoda
- Order: Stylommatophora
- Family: Camaenidae
- Genus: Aegista
- Species: A. impexa

Binomial name
- Aegista impexa (Pilsbry & Hirase, 1905)

Synonyms
- Aegista (Plectotropis) impexa (Pilsbry & Hirase, 1905) · alternative representation; Eulota (Plectotropis) impexa Pilsbry & Hirase, 1905 (original combination)

Species of gastropod

Aegista impexa is a species of air-breathing land snails, a terrestrial pulmonate gastropod in the family Camaenidae.

== Description ==
The diameter of the shell attains 26.7 mm (1.05 in), its height 10 mm (0.39 in).

The shell boasts a prominently open umbilicus, with a regularly conical shape. It appears low conoid above and convex beneath. The shell exhibits a rather thin, pale, and translucent brown hue. The sculpture consists of low oblique wrinkles tracing the lines of growth, alongside minute, very short cuticular threads adhering in some areas. The base of the shell displays dense but not highly distinct spiral striations. The peripheral filaments are sparse and short. With approximately 6½ whorls, the shell gradually widens, with earlier whorls convex and later ones nearly flat. The body whorl is acutely carinated, with the base forming an angular contour around the umbilicus. The aperture is very oblique, with a narrowly expanded outer lip. The basal margin is narrowly reflexed and deeply arcuate, while the columellar margin is dilated. A very thin parietal callus completes the interior adornment.

== Distribution ==
This species occurs in Taiwan.
