= Aegista stenomphala =

Scientific classification
- Kingdom: Animalia
- Phylum: Mollusca
- Class: Gastropoda
- Order: Stylommatophora
- Family: Camaenidae
- Genus: Aegista
- Species: A. stenomphala

Binomial name
- Aegista stenomphala Minato, 2003
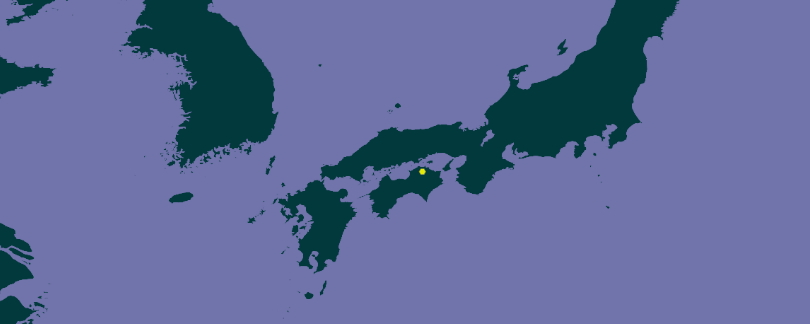

Species of gastropod

Aegista stenomphala is a species of air-breathing land snails, a terrestrial pulmonate gastropod in the family of Camaenidae.

== Distribution ==
This species occurs in Shikoku, Japan.
