= Aegista pseudopapuina =

Scientific classification
- Kingdom: Animalia
- Phylum: Mollusca
- Class: Gastropoda
- Order: Stylommatophora
- Family: Camaenidae
- Genus: Aegista
- Species: A. pseudopapuina

Binomial name
- Aegista pseudopapuina (Möllendorff, 1901)

Synonyms
- Euhadra pseudopapuina Möllendorff, 1901 · unaccepted (original combination)

Species of gastropod

Aegista pseudopapuina is a species of air-breathing land snails, a terrestrial pulmonate gastropod in the family Camaenidae.

== Description ==
The diameter of the shell attains 21.6 mm, its height 12 mm.

(Original description in Latin) The shell has a depressed trochiform shape and has a narrow, semi-oblique umbilicus. It is solid, with thin and irregular folded striations, dotted with rough spiral lines. The coloration is yellow-horn, either uniform or with a chestnut band in the middle whorls. The spire is slightly raised with convex sides. The apex is blunt, brownish, and punctate-granular. The shell consists of five convex whorls. The body whorl has a sharp and well-carinate keel on both sides. The base of the shell shows a narrow chestnut band. The aperture is diagonal and wide, axe-shaped. The peristome is straight above, then more expanded and reflexive towards the umbilicus. The columella is widened at the top.

== Distribution ==
This species occurs in Vietnam.
