= Aegista proba =

Scientific classification
- Kingdom: Animalia
- Phylum: Mollusca
- Class: Gastropoda
- Order: Stylommatophora
- Family: Camaenidae
- Genus: Aegista
- Species: A. proba

Binomial name
- Aegista proba (A. Adams, 1868)
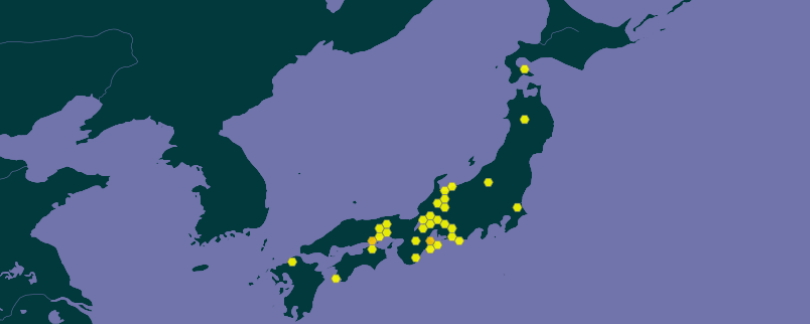

Synonyms
- Aegista (Aegista) proba (A. Adams, 1868) (no subgenera are recognized); Helix (Fruticicola) proba A. Adams, 1868 superseded combination

Species of gastropod

Aegista proba is a species of air-breathing land snails, a terrestrial pulmonate gastropod in the family Camaenidae.

Subspecies

- Aegista proba eminens (Pilsbry & Y. Hirase, 1904)
- Aegista proba goniosoma (Pilsbry & Y. Hirase, 1904)
- Aegista proba goniosomoides Kuroda & Abe, 1980
- Aegista proba mikuriyensis (Pilsbry, 1902)
- Aegista proba mimula (Pilsbry, 1900)
- Aegista proba proba (A. Adams, 1868)

== Description ==
(Original description in Latin) The reddish-brown shell is orbicular-depressed with a broad and perspective umbilicus. It shows oblique striations. The spirals are barely raised. It has six flat whorls, with the body whorl being obtusely subangulated at the periphery. The aperture is rounded-lunate and very oblique. The peristome is shortly reflexed and regularly arched at the base.

== Distribution ==
This species occurs in Japan and Korea.
