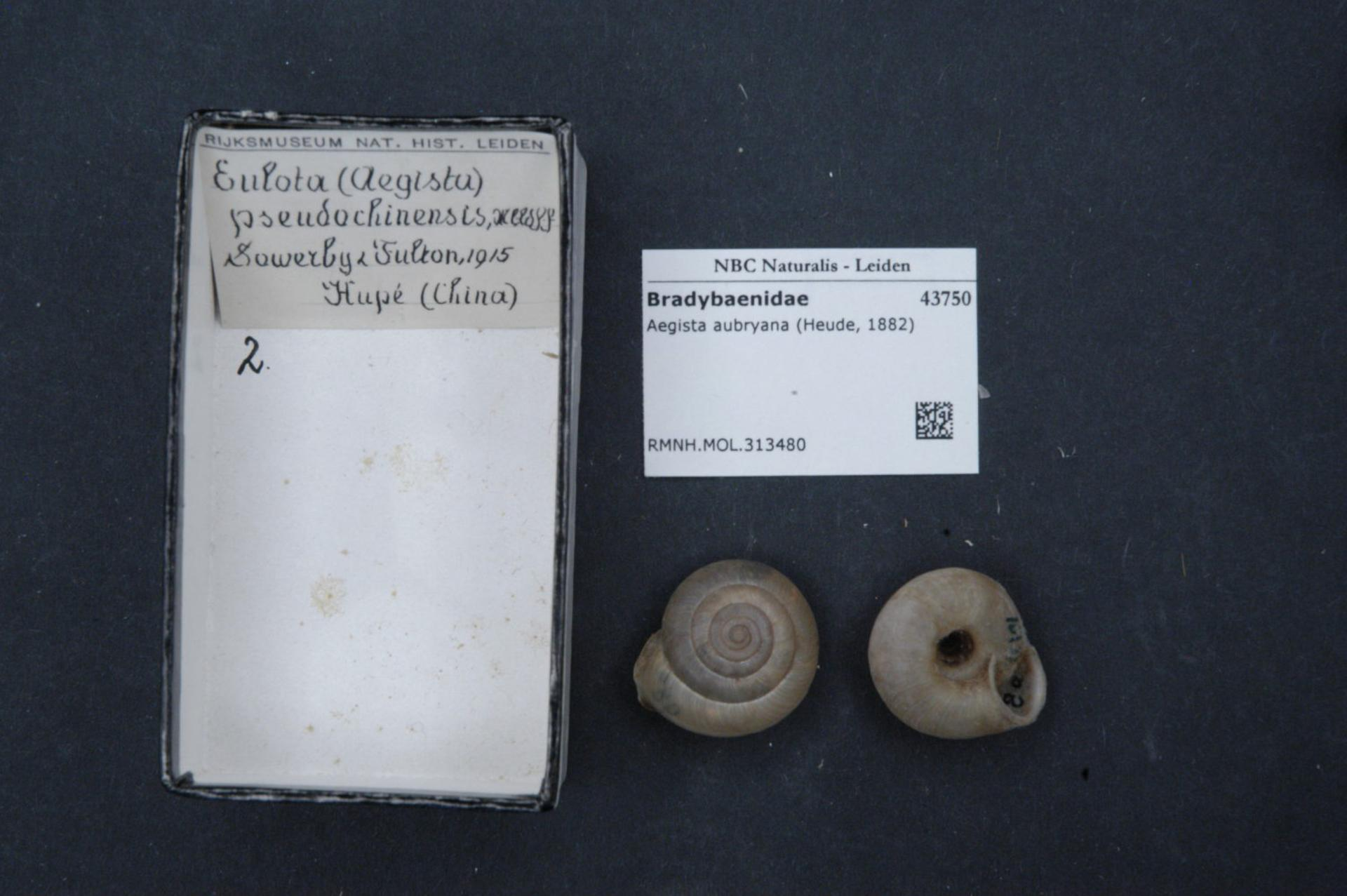
- Shells of Aegista aubryana

Scientific classification
- Kingdom: Animalia
- Phylum: Mollusca
- Class: Gastropoda
- Order: Stylommatophora
- Family: Camaenidae
- Subfamily: Bradybaeninae
- Tribe: Aegistini
- Genus: Aegista
- Species: A. aubryana

Binomial name
- Aegista aubryana (Heude, 1882)

Synonyms
- Helix aubryana Heude, 1882 (original combination)

= Aegista aubryana =

Species of gastropod

Aegista aubryana is a species of air-breathing land snails, a terrestrial pulmonate gastropod in the family Camaenidae.

== Description ==
The diameter of the shell attains 21 mm.

The shell is widely umbilicated. It is thin, obliquely striate and brownish white. The suture is impressed. The shell contains seven whorls. These are slightly convex above. The periphery is obtusely angulated, deflected in front and more convex on the base. The white peristome is thin and reflected.

== Distribution ==
This species occurs in China: province Guizhou.
