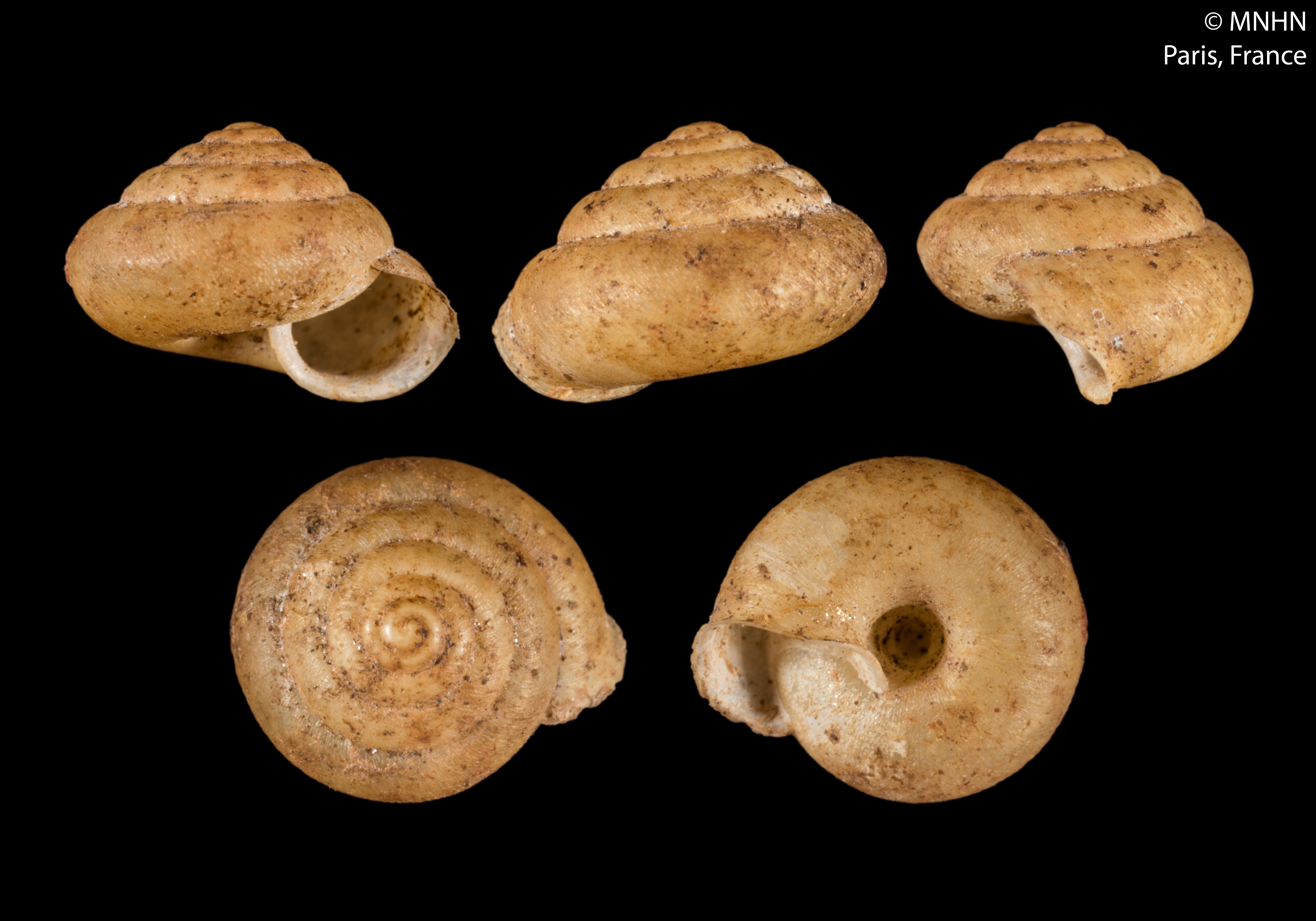
- Shell of Aegista subinflexa (specimen at MNHN, Paris)

Scientific classification
- Kingdom: Animalia
- Phylum: Mollusca
- Class: Gastropoda
- Order: Stylommatophora
- Family: Camaenidae
- Genus: Aegista
- Species: A. subinflexa

Binomial name
- Aegista subinflexa (Mabille, 1889)
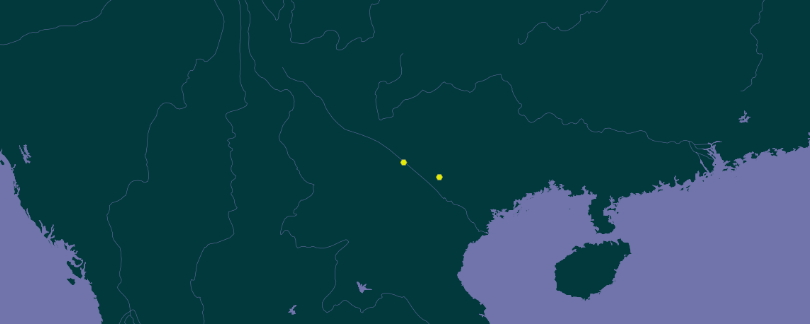

Synonyms
- Helix (Plectotropis) subinflexa Mabille, 1889 (unaccepted combination); Helix subinflexa Mabille, 1889 (original combination); Plectotropis subinflexa (Mabille, 1889)

= Aegista subinflexa =

Species of gastropod

Aegista subinflexa is a species of air-breathing land snails, a terrestrial pulmonate gastropod in the family Camaenidae.

Subspecies

- Aegista subinflexa major (Bavay & Dautzenberg, 1909)
- Aegista subinflexa minor (Bavay & Dautzenberg, 1909)

== Distribution ==
This species occurs in Vietnam and Laos.
