= Aegista hachijoensis =

Scientific classification
- Kingdom: Animalia
- Phylum: Mollusca
- Class: Gastropoda
- Order: Stylommatophora
- Family: Camaenidae
- Genus: Aegista
- Species: A. hachijoensis

Binomial name
- Aegista hachijoensis (Pilsbry, 1902)

Synonyms
- Eulota (Plectropis) hachijoensis Pilsbry, 1902

Species of gastropod

Aegista hachijoensis is a species of air-breathing land snails, a terrestrial pulmonate gastropod in the family Camaenidae.

== Description ==
The diameter of the shell attains 10 mm, its height 5.4 mm.

The shell is narrowly umbilicate, biconvex, and prominently carinate. It displays a pale brown or whitish corneous coloration. Its surface possesses a glossy sheen. Under magnification, it is finely and faintly spirally striated beneath, more obsoletely so above. The shell contains approximately 4½ whorls, each moderately convex. The body whorl descends slightly below the keel at the front, with a subtle concavity evident above and below the peripheral keel. The aperture is oblique and irregularly oval in shape. The peristome is slightly expanded above and reflexed below, with a scant thickening and ends that draw nearer together.

The pale color of the somewhat translucent, acutely carinate shell, and its beautiful sculpture of spiral striae beneath are the more prominent features of this species.

== Distribution ==
This species occurs in Japan and Korea
