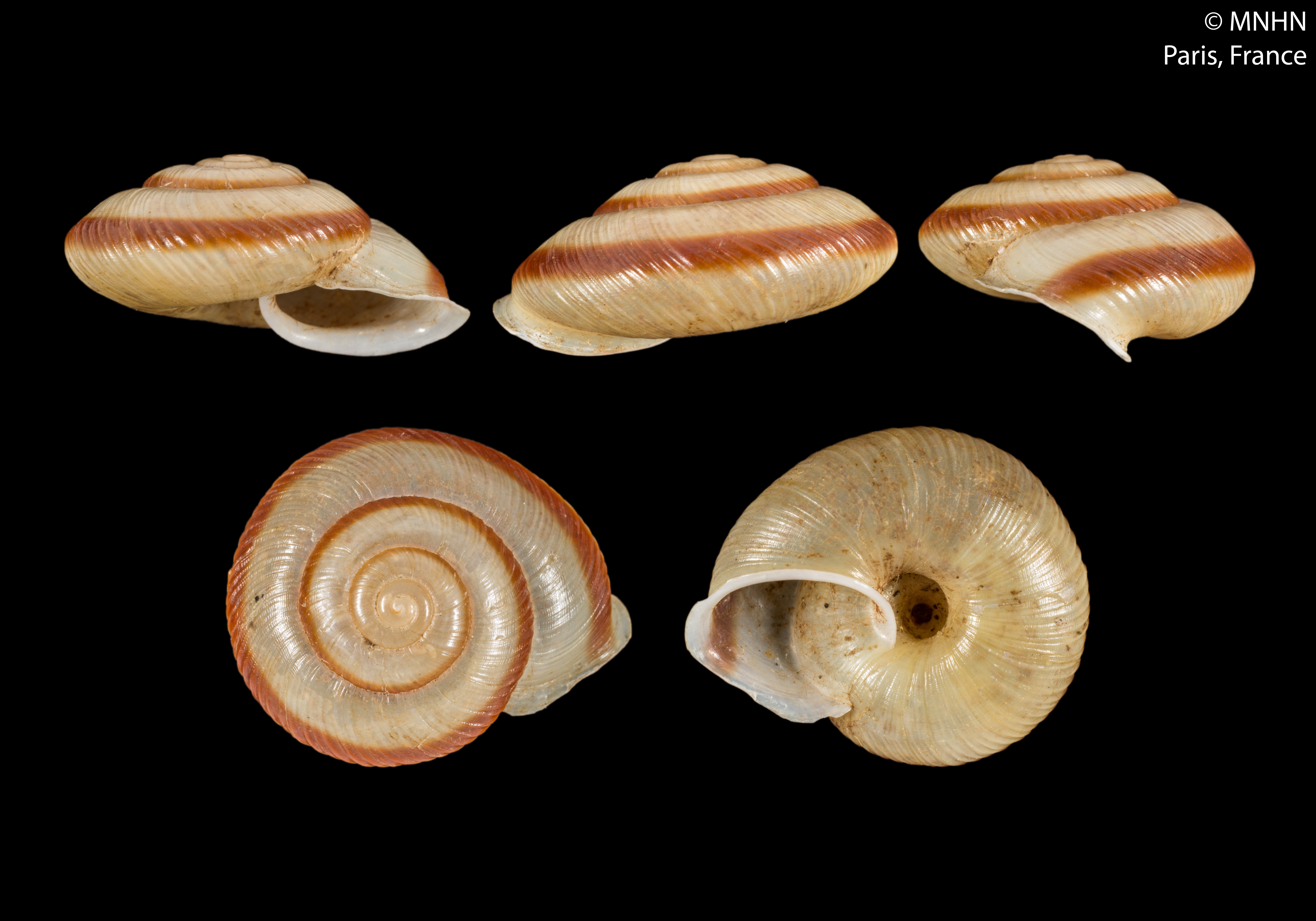
- Shell of Aegista packhaensis (syntype at MNHN, Paris)

Scientific classification
- Kingdom: Animalia
- Phylum: Mollusca
- Class: Gastropoda
- Order: Stylommatophora
- Family: Camaenidae
- Genus: Aegista
- Species: A. packhaensis

Binomial name
- Aegista packhaensis (Bavay & Dautzenberg, 1909)

Synonyms
- Helix (Aegista) packhaensis Bavay & Dautzenberg, 1909 (original combination); Helix (Aegista) packhaensis var. azona Bavay & Dautzenberg, 1909 (junior synonym); Helix (Aegista) packhaensis var. rufula Bavay & Dautzenberg, 1909 (junior synonym)

= Aegista packhaensis =

Species of gastropod

Aegista packhaensis is a species of air-breathing land snails, a terrestrial pulmonate gastropod in the family Camaenidae.

== Distribution ==
This shell occurs in Vietnam.
