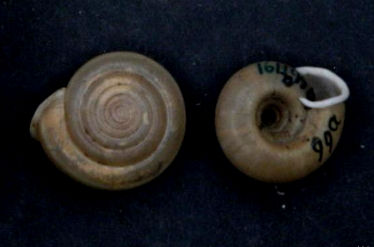
- Shell of Aegista platyomphala (specimen at Naturalis Biodiversity Center)

Scientific classification
- Kingdom: Animalia
- Phylum: Mollusca
- Class: Gastropoda
- Order: Stylommatophora
- Family: Camaenidae
- Genus: Aegista
- Species: A. platyomphala

Binomial name
- Aegista platyomphala (Möllendorff, 1885)

Synonyms
- Helix platyomphala Möllendorff, 1885 (original combination)

= Aegista platyomphala =

Species of gastropod

Aegista platyomphala is a species of air-breathing land snails, a terrestrial pulmonate gastropod in the family Camaenidae.

== Description ==
The diameter of the shell is 17.5 mm.

The thin shell is extensively umbilicated, translucent and horn-like. It is finely and closely obliquely striated, with a well-defined suture. It comprises seven whorls, slightly convex, with the body whorl faintly angled above, featuring a whitish band, and gently curved towards the front. The umbilicus is bounded by a distinct edge. The peristome is thickened, white, and turned outward.

== Distribution ==
This species is endemic to China, Guangxi province.
