= Aegista perplexa =

Scientific classification
- Kingdom: Animalia
- Phylum: Mollusca
- Class: Gastropoda
- Order: Stylommatophora
- Family: Camaenidae
- Genus: Aegista
- Species: A. perplexa

Binomial name
- Aegista perplexa (Pilsbry & Hirase, 1905)

Synonyms
- Aegista (Plectotropis) perplexa (Pilsbry & Hirase, 1905) · alternative representation; Eulota (Plectotropis) perplexa Pilsbry & Hirase, 1905 (original combination)

Species of gastropod

Aegista perplexa is a species of air-breathing land snails, a terrestrial pulmonate gastropod in the family Camaenidae.

== Description ==
The diameter of the shell attains 12 mm, its height 8.2 mm.

The shell adopts a trochoidal form, exhibiting thinness and a relatively open umbilicus, with the umbilicus approximately one-fourth the diameter of the shell and swiftly narrowing inward. Its surface appears dull, cloaked in a brown cuticle. The shell shows minute, closely spaced, short, linear, raised processes above the periphery, while beneath the periphery, indistinct, fine spiral lines are intricately engraved. The shell contains around 6¼ whorls, each slowly expanding and slightly convex. The body whorl features a subtle yet acute keel at the periphery, descending modestly below the keel towards the aperture. The suture is well impressed, tracing the lower edge of the keel. The aperture presents an oblique orientation. The peristome is thin. The basal and outer margins are narrowly reflexed and arcuate, while the upper margin exhibits a slight curvature and minimal expansion. The columellar margin is nearly vertical, arcuate, and dilated above, with a very thin parietal callus completing the internal structure.

== Distribution ==
This species occurs in Taiwan.
