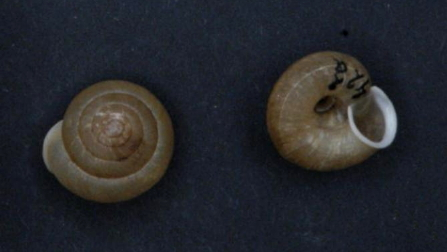
- Shell of Aegista tumida (specimen at Naturalis Biodiversity Center)

Scientific classification
- Kingdom: Animalia
- Phylum: Mollusca
- Class: Gastropoda
- Order: Stylommatophora
- Family: Camaenidae
- Genus: Aegista
- Species: A. tumida

Binomial name
- Aegista tumida (Gude, 1901)
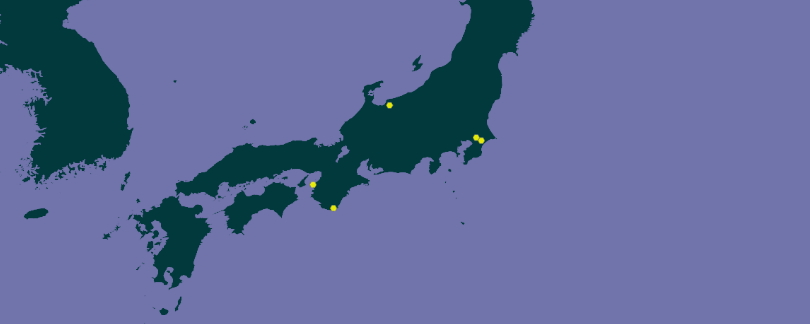

Synonyms
- Aegista (Aegista) tumida (Gude, 1901) (no subgenera are recognized); Eulota (Aegista) friedeliana var. tumida Gude, 1901 (basionym)

= Aegista tumida =

Species of gastropod

Aegista tumida is a species of air-breathing land snail, a terrestrial pulmonate gastropod mollusk in the family Camaenidae.

Subspecies

- Aegista tumida cavata (Pilsbry, 1902)
- Aegista tumida tumida (Gude, 1901)

== Description ==
The diameter of the shell attains 15.5 mm, its height 13.5 mm.

(Original description) This species differs from the type in several key aspects: it is darker in color, has more tumid whorls, a higher spire, and a wider umbilicus. Additionally, the cuticular lamellae are much less pronounced. One specimen exhibits a pale peripheral band, giving the shell a strong resemblance to Aegista oculus (L. Pfeiffer, 1850).

== Distribution ==
This snail occurs on Honshu Island, Japan.
