= Aegista diversa =

Scientific classification
- Kingdom: Animalia
- Phylum: Mollusca
- Class: Gastropoda
- Order: Stylommatophora
- Family: Camaenidae
- Genus: Aegista
- Species: A. diversa

Binomial name
- Aegista diversa Kuroda & Miyanaga, 1936

Synonyms
- Aegista (Plectotropis) diversa Kuroda & Miyanaga, 1936

Species of gastropod

Aegista diversa is a species of air-breathing land snails, a terrestrial pulmonate gastropod in the family Camaenidae, and was first described in 1936 by Tokubei Kuroda. It is an hermaphrodite with fertililisation occurring as the eggs are laid.

Subspecies

- Aegista diversa excellens Kuroda & Miyanaga, 1939

== Distribution and habitat ==
This species is endemic to Korea, where it is found in forests under moist fallen leaves or under rocks, in the mountainous areas of the central & northern regions.
