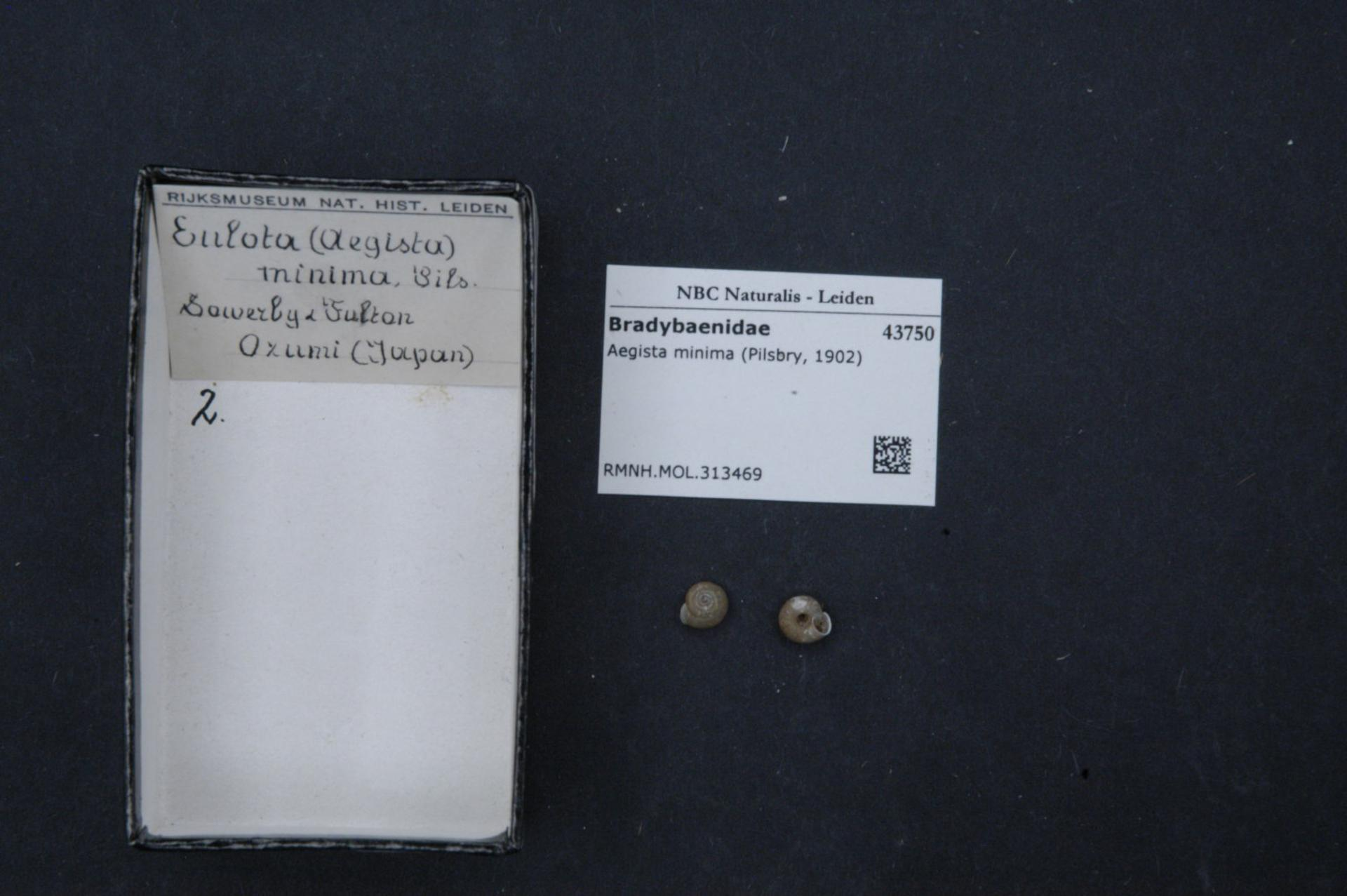
- Shell of Aegista minima (specimen at Naturalis Biodiversity Center)

Scientific classification
- Kingdom: Animalia
- Phylum: Mollusca
- Class: Gastropoda
- Order: Stylommatophora
- Family: Camaenidae
- Genus: Aegista
- Species: A. minima

Binomial name
- Aegista minima (Pilsbry, 1902)

Synonyms
- Aegista (Aegista) minima (Pilsbry, 1902) (no subgenera are recognized); Eulota (Plectropis) minima Pilsbry, 1902

= Aegista minima =

Species of gastropod

Aegista minima is a species of air-breathing land snails, a terrestrial pulmonate gastropod in the family Camaenidae.

== Description ==
The diameter of the shell attains 6.3 mm (0.25 in), its height 3 mm (0.12 in).

The shell is distinctly umbilicate, convex above and below, with a broad, rounded edge around the periphery. The shell is adorned in a light yellowish-brown hue. Its surface is adorned with a dense layer of fine, short cuticular scales, easily removed with a gentle rub. It contains approximately five whorls, each gradually expanding and convex, delineated by an impressed suture. The body whorl widens notably, remaining convex on its underside without a noticeable descent towards the front. The aperture takes on a broad crescent shape and is slightly tilted. The peristome is delicately thickened and narrowly expanded, slightly reflexed.

== Distribution ==
This species occurs in Japan.
