= Aegista celsa =

Scientific classification
- Kingdom: Animalia
- Phylum: Mollusca
- Class: Gastropoda
- Order: Stylommatophora
- Family: Camaenidae
- Subfamily: Bradybaeninae
- Tribe: Aegistini
- Genus: Aegista
- Species: A. celsa

Binomial name
- Aegista celsa (Pilsbry & Y. Hirase, 1908)
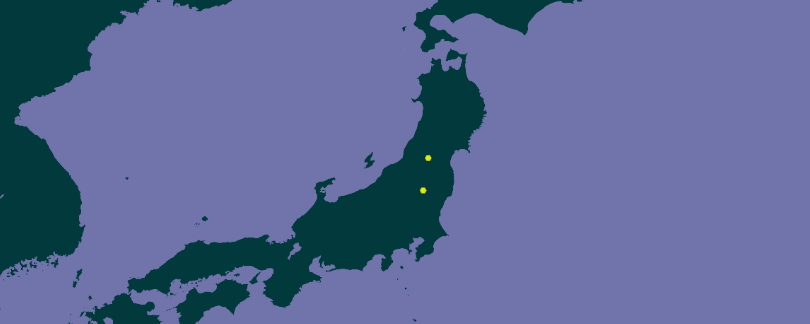

Synonyms
- Aegista (Aegista) celsa (Pilsbry & Y. Hirase, 1908) (no subgenera are recognized); Eulota (Aegista) celsa Pilsbry & Y. Hirase, 1908 (original combination)

Species of gastropod

Aegista celsa is a species of air-breathing land snails in the family Camaenidae. It is endemic to Japan.

== Description ==
The diameter of the shell attains 12 mm.

The shell assumes a convexly conical form, featuring a deep, well-like umbilicus with a cylindrical shape. The periphery presents an obtuse angularity. Its surface, lacking luster, adopts a chestnut brown hue. The shell is finely but not prominently striated on the upper surface, with indistinct striae at the base. However, toward the aperture on the last part of the body whorl, the striae partially transform into elongated granules. The spire has convex contours and a blunt apex. It contains approximately 6 1/3 whorls, each gently widening. The body whorl descends slowly and slightly, exhibiting a vague angularity at the front periphery before transitioning into a rounded form on the latter portion. The aperture, notably oblique, surpasses the umbilicus in size significantly. Its peristome, thin in texture, displays only a marginal expansion on the outer side, while the basal margin curves deeply and slightly expansively. The columellar margin broadens triangularly. The terminations of the outer lip are widely spaced. The parietal callus remains delicately thin.

== Distribution ==
This species occurs in Honshu, Japan.
