= Aegista baphica =

Scientific classification
- Kingdom: Animalia
- Phylum: Mollusca
- Class: Gastropoda
- Order: Stylommatophora
- Family: Camaenidae
- Genus: Aegista
- Species: A. baphica

Binomial name
- Aegista baphica (Mabille, 1888)

Synonyms
- Helix baphica Mabille, 1888 (original combination)

Species of gastropod

Aegista baphica is a species of air-breathing land snails, a terrestrial pulmonate gastropod in the family Camaenidae.

== Description ==
The diameter of the shell attains 21 mm, its height 6 mm.

(Original description in Latin) The shell is narrowly umbilicate, subglobose-depressed, somewhat thick, and solid. It has a grayish, shiny appearance with sublamelliform ribs that are slightly prominent and spaced apart. The spire is depressed-conoidal, barely prominent, with a shiny, obtuse apex of the same color. It has 5 to 5½ convex whorls that increase irregularly and rapidly, separated by distinct sutures. The body whorl is the most convex, angled at the periphery, not descending at the aperture, turgid underneath, and slightly funnel-shaped with a dark ring around the umbilicus. The aperture is oblique, lunate, and oblong-rounded, featuring a white peristome that is thickened and expanded on the inside. The margins of the columella are also expanded, partially covering the umbilicus.

== Distribution and habitat ==
This shell occurs in Vietnam.
