= Aegista omma =

Scientific classification
- Kingdom: Animalia
- Phylum: Mollusca
- Class: Gastropoda
- Order: Stylommatophora
- Family: Camaenidae
- Genus: Aegista
- Species: A. omma

Binomial name
- Aegista omma (Pilsbry & Y. Hirase, 1904)
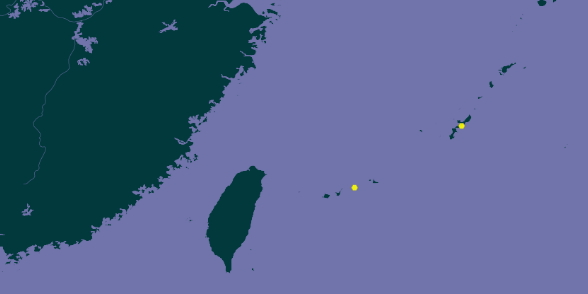

Synonyms
- Aegista (Aegista) omma (Pilsbry & Y. Hirase, 1904) (no subgenera are recognized); Eulota (Aegista) omma Pilsbry & Y. Hirase, 1904 (original combination)

Species of gastropod

Aegista omma is a species of air-breathing land snails, a terrestrial pulmonate gastropod in the family Camaenidae.

== Description ==
The diameter of the shell attains 19 mm, its height 11.5 mm.

This shell closely resembles Aegista oculus (L. Pfeiffer, 1850). The shell is yellowish olivaceous-brown, densely obliquely striated above, and more glossy and smoother below. The shell contains seven slightly convex whorls that enlarge slowly and regularly. The first two whorls are nearly smooth. The body whorl is slightly deflexed in front and obtusely angular at the periphery, with a very convex base. The deep and ample umbilicus is nearly one-third the diameter of the shell. The last half-whorl enlarges more rapidly. The aperture is rather small, hardly larger than the umbilicus, oblique, and rounded, with the preceding whorl excising about one-fourth of the circle. The peristome is narrowly reflexed throughout, and the columellar margin is very steeply ascending and hardly dilated.

== Distribution ==
This shell occurs in Japan.
