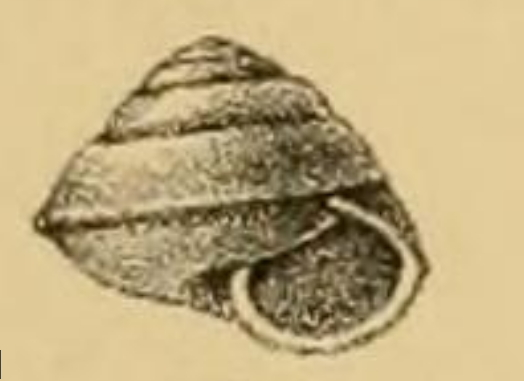
- Shell of Aegista crassiuscula (holotype)

Scientific classification
- Domain: Eukaryota
- Kingdom: Animalia
- Phylum: Mollusca
- Class: Gastropoda
- Order: Stylommatophora
- Family: Camaenidae
- Subfamily: Bradybaeninae
- Tribe: Aegistini
- Genus: Aegista
- Species: A. crassiuscula

Binomial name
- Aegista crassiuscula (E. A. Smith, 1896)
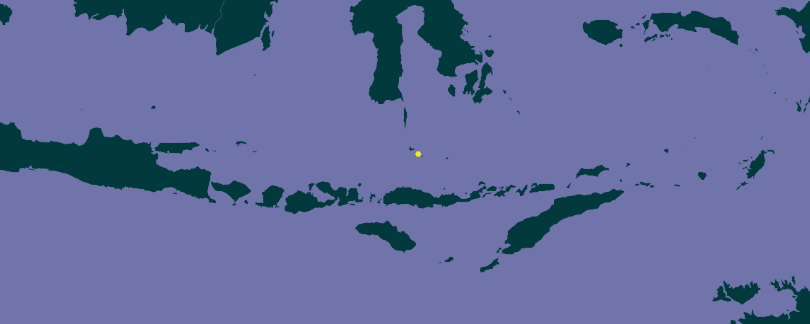

Synonyms
- Plectotropis crassiuscula E. A. Smith, 1896 (original combination)

= Aegista crassiuscula =

Species of gastropod

Aegista crassiuscula is a species of air-breathing land snails, a terrestrial pulmonate gastropod in the family Camaenidae.

== Description ==
The diameter of the shell attains 9 mm, its height 7.5 mm.

(Description originally in Latin) The shell assumes an obtusely conical shape, featuring a prominent keel and a distinct umbilicus. The shell exhibits a brownish hue. Delicate growth lines and additional spirals, particularly evident above and below the midpoint of the body whorl, are intricately carved. The spirals themselves are convex, with a gentle, rounded contour. The shell contains approximately six whorls, from which small convexities gradually emerge, culminating in a keeled body whorl where the area above and below the keel is concavely impressed. Below the convexities, the whorl barely descends. The depth of the umbilicus measures about 1/5 diameter. The aperture appears oblique and sublunate, albeit small in size. The peristome presents a pale hue and is notably thickened, with minimal expansion and edges that are slightly flattened, connected by a thin callus.

== Distribution ==
This species occurs on the Selayar Islands, Sulawesi, Indonesia.
