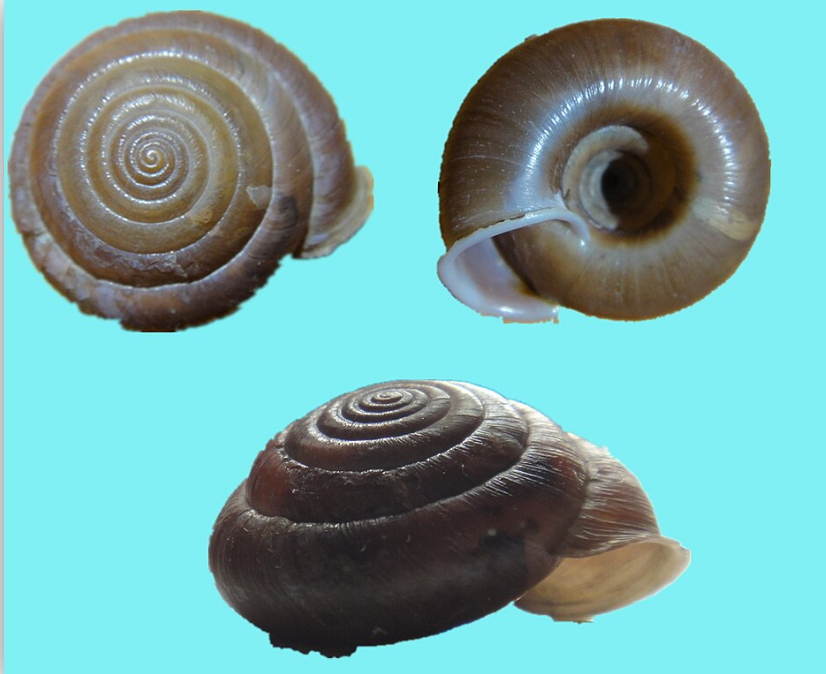
- Shell of Aegista vermis

Scientific classification
- Kingdom: Animalia
- Phylum: Mollusca
- Class: Gastropoda
- Order: Stylommatophora
- Family: Camaenidae
- Subfamily: Bradybaeninae
- Tribe: Aegistini
- Genus: Aegista
- Species: A. vermis

Binomial name
- Aegista vermis (Reeve, 1852))
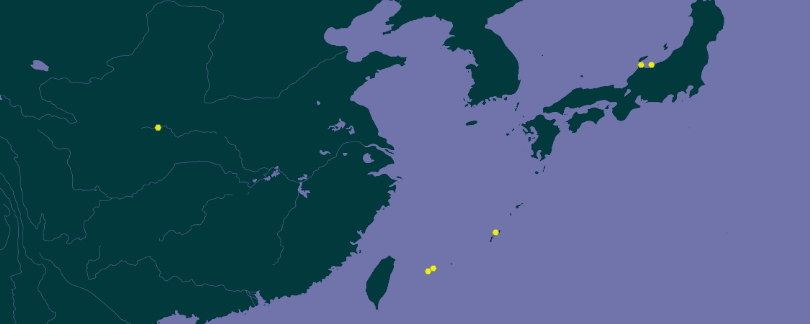

Synonyms
- Aegista (Aegista) vermis (Reeve, 1852) (no subgenera are recognized); Helix vermis Reeve, 1852 (original combination)

= Aegista vermis =

Species of gastropod

Aegista vermis is a species of air-breathing land snails, a terrestrial pulmonate gastropod in the family Camaenidae.

== Description ==
The diameter of the shell attains 32 mm.

The shell displays a markedly wide umbilicus, presenting a solid structure. It is intricately marked with closely spaced rugose striations, imparting a radiant fulvous horn-like appearance, accentuated by a delicate white peripheral line. The shell shows eight flattened whorls that gradually increase in size. The body whorl barely projects forward. The shell's periphery adopts a subtly angular form. Its peristome, thin and whitish, elegantly reflects outward.

== Distribution ==
This species occurs in Japan.
