= Aegista calcicola =

Scientific classification
- Kingdom: Animalia
- Phylum: Mollusca
- Class: Gastropoda
- Order: Stylommatophora
- Family: Camaenidae
- Genus: Aegista
- Species: A. calcicola

Binomial name
- Aegista calcicola (Masuda & Habe, 1989)

Synonyms
- Trishoplita calcicola Masuda & Habe, 1989 superseded combination

Species of gastropod

Aegista calcicola is a species of air-breathing land snails, a terrestrial pulmonate gastropod in the family Camaenidae.

== Distribution and habitat ==
This shell occurs in Japan and Korea.
