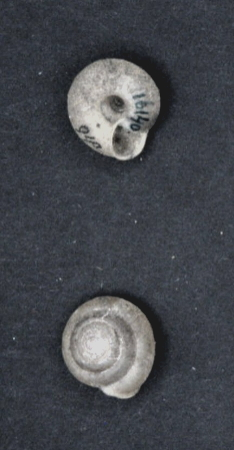
- Shell of Aegista tapeina (specimen at Naturalis Biodiversity Center)

Scientific classification
- Domain: Eukaryota
- Kingdom: Animalia
- Phylum: Mollusca
- Class: Gastropoda
- Order: Stylommatophora
- Family: Camaenidae
- Subfamily: Bradybaeninae
- Tribe: Aegistini
- Genus: Aegista
- Species: A. tapeina

Binomial name
- Aegista tapeina (W. H. Benson, 1836)
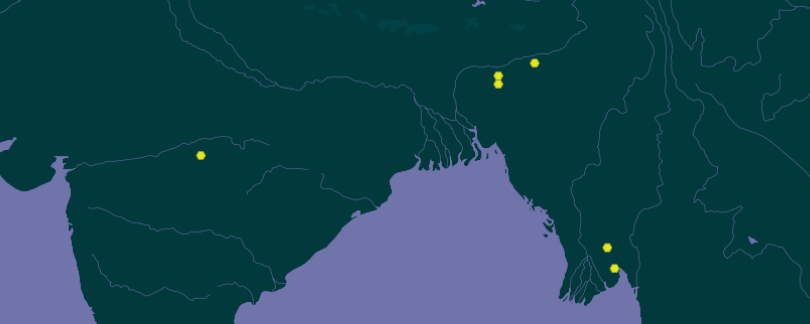

Synonyms
- Aegista (Plectotropis) tapeina (W. H. Benson, 1836) (unaccepted combination); Helix (Plectotropis) tapeina W. H. Benson, 1836 (unaccepted combination); Helix tapeina W. H. Benson, 1836 (original combination); Plectotropis tapeina (W. H. Benson, 1836)

= Aegista tapeina =

Species of gastropod

Aegista tapeina is a species of air-breathing land snails, a terrestrial pulmonate gastropod in the family Camaenidae.

== Description ==
The diameter of the shell varies between 7.7 mm and 8.1 mm.

The shell is moderately large, exhibiting a robust, greenish hue. It is subdepressedly conoid and rather lenticular. It is widely umbilicate. The shell features faint oblique stripes with spiral markings that are not prominently defined. The spire is low and conoid. The shell comprises 6-7 whorls each somewhat flattened above. The body whorl is bluntly angulate at the periphery, rounded below, rounding out below and forming a subtle angle around the umbilicus before gently sloping downward. The aperture is slightly slanted and semicircular. The thin peristome is slightly turned outward. The columellar margin is simple and very slightly reflected.

The species displays variation in both the height of the spire and the angularity of the body whorl. Distinguishing itself from the aforementioned characteristics, it typically exhibits a narrower umbilicus, measuring less than 5 mm in width, while also boasting a slightly taller stature and a more pronounced angularity.

== Distribution ==
This species occurs in Myanmar, India, China and Java, Indonesia.
