= Aegista catostoma =

Scientific classification
- Kingdom: Animalia
- Phylum: Mollusca
- Class: Gastropoda
- Order: Stylommatophora
- Family: Camaenidae
- Subfamily: Bradybaeninae
- Tribe: Aegistini
- Genus: Aegista
- Species: A. catostoma

Binomial name
- Aegista catostoma (W. T. Blanford, 1869)

Synonyms
- Aegista (Aegista) catostoma (W. T. Blanford, 1869) (no subgenera are recognized); Helix (Plectotropis) catostoma W. T. Blanford, 1869 (unaccepted combination); Helix (Trachia) catostoma W. T. Blanford, 1869 (original combination)

Species of gastropod

Aegista catostoma is a species of air-breathing land snails, a terrestrial pulmonate gastropod in the family Camaenidae.

== Description ==
The diameter of the shell attains 16 mm.

The shell exhibits a prominent wide umbilicus and is characterized by its thin, striated, and corneous texture. The shell contains 7 convex whorls, each gradually expanding in size. The body whorl is rounded and abruptly descends towards the front, featuring a subtle constriction behind the aperture and a compressed area around the umbilicus. The peristome is sinuously curved and reflects inward, displaying a superior internal projection, along with basal thickenings that are somewhat dentiform in nature.

== Distribution ==
This species occurs in Myanmar, India, China.
