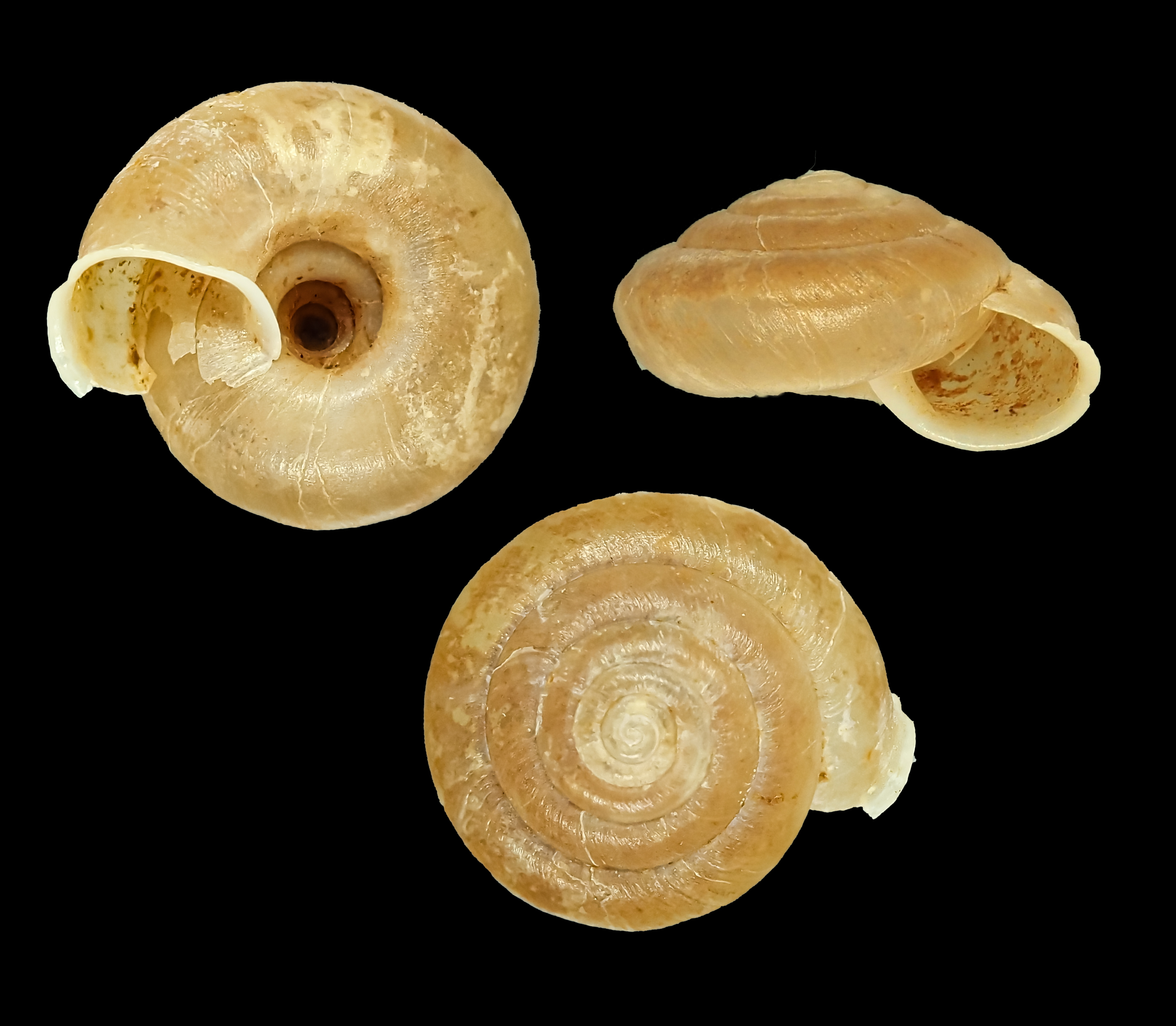
- Shell of Aegista stephanieclarkae (holotype at MNHN, Paris)

Scientific classification
- Domain: Eukaryota
- Kingdom: Animalia
- Phylum: Mollusca
- Class: Gastropoda
- Order: Stylommatophora
- Family: Camaenidae
- Genus: Aegista
- Species: A. stephanieclarkae

Binomial name
- Aegista stephanieclarkae Thach & F. Huber, 2021

= Aegista stephanieclarkae =

Species of gastropod

Aegista stephanieclarkae is a species of air-breathing land snails, a terrestrial pulmonate gastropod in the family Camaenidae.

== Distribution ==
This species occurs in Laos
