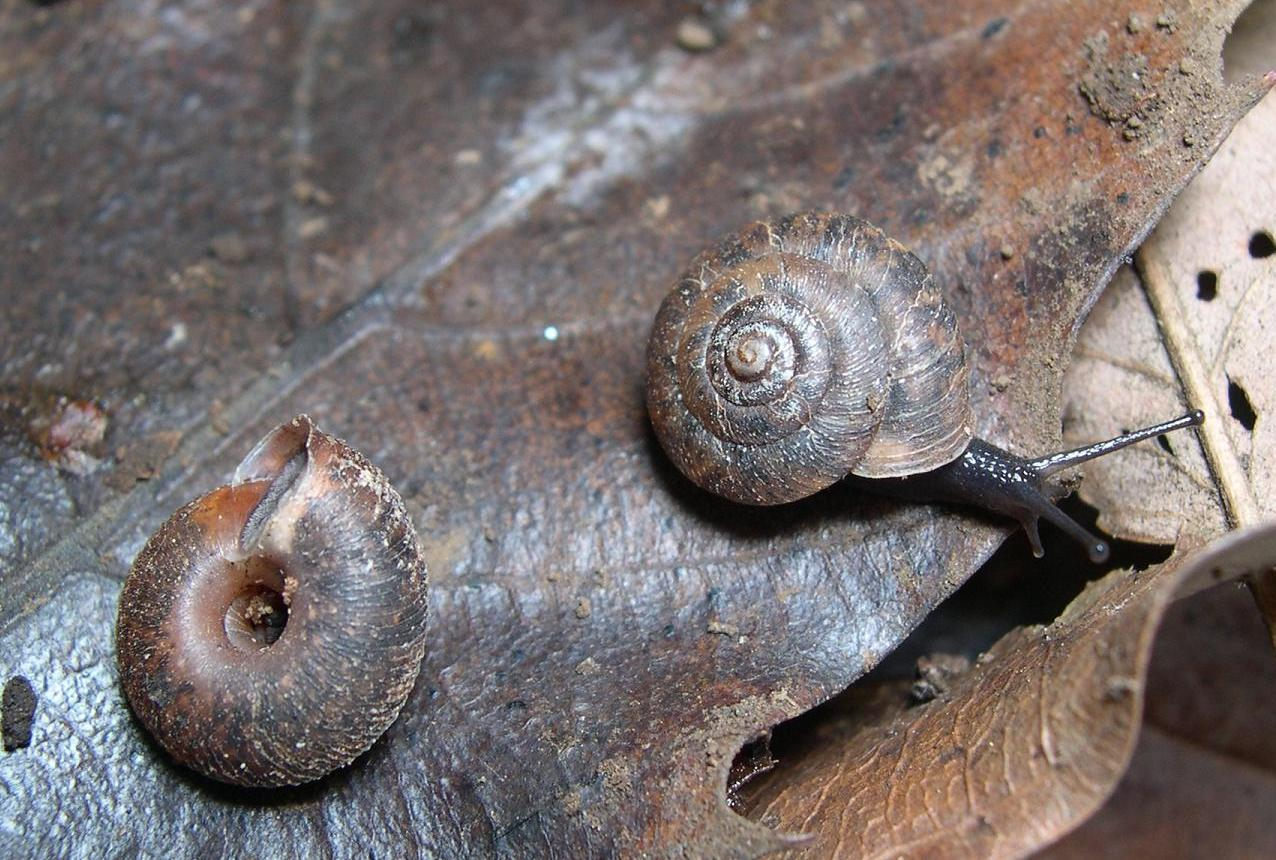
- Aegista tokyoensis

Scientific classification
- Kingdom: Animalia
- Phylum: Mollusca
- Class: Gastropoda
- Order: Stylommatophora
- Family: Camaenidae
- Subfamily: Bradybaeninae
- Tribe: Aegistini
- Genus: Aegista; Albers, 1850

Type species
- Helix chinensis Philippi, 1845
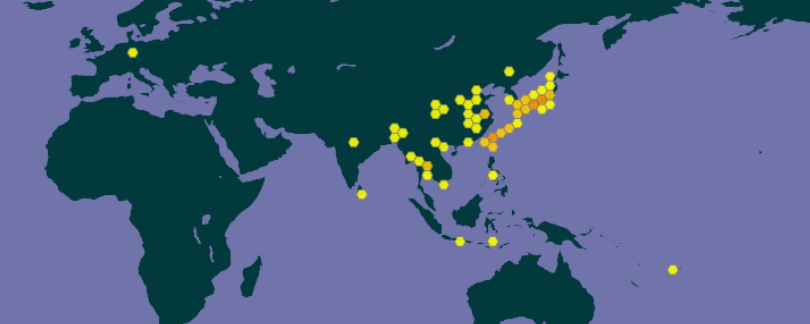

Synonyms
- Aegista (Aegista) Albers, 1850 (no subgenera are recognized); Eulota (Aegista) Albers, 1850 (unaccepted combination); Helix (Aegista) Albers, 1850

= Aegista =

Genus of gastropods

Aegista is a genus of air-breathing land snails, terrestrial pulmonate gastropod mollusks in the family Camaenidae.

== Anatomy ==
Species within this genus create and use love darts as part of their mating behavior.

== Description ==
The thin, conical or lenticular shell is depressed and widely umbilicated. The shell is uniform corneous. The shell is strongly sculptured. The periphery is rounded, or obtusely angulated. The rounded body whorl is descending in front. The peristome is slightly expanded, a little thickened within.

In the past, this genus has often been used interchangeably with Plectotropis Martens, 1860.

== Distribution ==
This genus of snails is distributed throughout from Southeast Asia to temperate East Asia.

== Species ==
Species within the genus Aegista include:

- Aegista accrescens (Heude, 1882)
- Aegista araneaetela (P.M. Heude, 1885) (synonym: Helix araneaetela Heude, 1885)
- Aegista aubryana (Heude, 1882)
- Aegista awajiensis (Gude, 1900)
- Aegista baphica (Mabille, 1888)
- Aegista caerulea Kuroda & T. Habe, 1960
- Aegista calcicola (Masuda & Habe, 1989)
- Aegista carinata (Gude, 1901)
- Aegista catostoma (W. T. Blanford, 1869)
- Aegista celsa (Pilsbry & Y. Hirase, 1908)
- Aegista chejuensis (Pilsbry & Hirase, 1908)
- Aegista chinensis (R. A. Philippi, 1845)
- Aegista chosenica (Pilsbry, 1927)
- Aegista congener Preston, 1914
- Aegista coudeini (Bavay & Dautzenberg, 1900)
- Aegista crassiuscula (E. A. Smith, 1896)
- Aegista diversa Kuroda & Miyanaga, 1936
- Aegista diversifamilia C.-W. Huang, Y.-C. Lee, S.-M. Lin & W.-L. Wu, 2014
- Aegista fausta Kuroda & Habe, 1951
- Aegista fauveli (Bavay & Dautzenberg, 1900)
- Aegista friedeliana (E. von Martens, 1864)
- Aegista fulvicans (H. Adams, 1866)
- Aegista furtiva (Heude, 1885)
- Aegista gitaena (Bavay & Dautzenberg, 1908)
- Aegista gottschei (Möllendorff, 1887)
- Aegista granti (L. Pfeiffer, 1865)
- Aegista hachijoensis (Pilsbry, 1902)
- Aegista hakusanensis M. Azuma & Y. Azuma, 1982
- Aegista hebes (Pilsbry & Hirase, 1905)
- Aegista herpestes (P.M. Heude, 1885)
- Aegista hiroshifukudai Hirano, Kameda & Chiba, 2016
- Aegista huberorum Thach, 2023
- Aegista hupeana (Gredler, 1886)
- Aegista impexa (Pilsbry & Hirase, 1905)
- Aegista inrinensis (Pilsbry & Hirase, 1905)
- Aegista intonsa (Pilsbry & Y. Hirase, 1902)
- Aegista kanmuriyamensis M. Azuma & Y. Azuma, 1982
- Aegista kantori Thach & F. Huber, 2021
- Aegista kobensis (Schmacker & O. Boettger, 1890) (accepted > unreplaced junior homonym, based on unavailable original name; gotoensis appears to be the earliest available name)
- Aegista kunimiensis M. Azuma & Y. Azuma, 1982
- Aegista laoyelingensis Zhang, 1993
- Aegista lasia (Pilsbry & Y. Hirase, 1909)
- Aegista laurentii (Gredler, 1887)
- Aegista lautsi (Schmacker & O. Boettger, 1890)
- Aegista mayasana (M. Azuma, 1969)
- Aegista megachila Möllendorff, 1899
- Aegista minima (Pilsbry, 1902)
- Aegista mitanensis (Godwin-Austen, 1889)
- Aegista nikkoensis Kuroda, 1982
- Aegista oculus (L. Pfeiffer, 1850)
- Aegista oldhami (Benson, 1859)
- Aegista omma (Pilsbry & Y. Hirase, 1904)
- Aegista onae Thach & F. Huber, 2021
- Aegista packhaensis Bavay & Dautzenberg, 1909)
- Aegista permellita (Heude, 1886)
- Aegista perplexa (Pilsbry & Hirase, 1905)
- Aegista phayrei (Theobald, 1859)
- Aegista platyomphala (Möllendorff, 1885)
- Aegista proba (A. Adams, 1868)
- Aegista proxima (Pilsbry & Y. Hirase, 1909)
- Aegista pseudopapuina (Möllendorff, 1901)
- Aegista pseudotrochula (Bavay & Dautzenberg, 1909)
- Aegista pygmaea Kuroda & Kawamoto, 1956
- Aegista pyramidata (Pilsbry, 1927)
- Aegista serpestes (Heude, 1890)
- Aegista squarrosa (A. Gould, 1859)
- Aegista stenomphala Minato, 2003
- Aegista stephanieclarkae Thach & F. Huber, 2021
- Aegista subchinensis (Möllendorff, 1884)
- Aegista subinflexa (Mabille, 1889)
- Aegista tadai Minato, 1983
- Aegista taiwanica Kuroda, 1941
- Aegista tapeina (W. H. Benson, 1836)
- Aegista tenerrima Möllendorff, 1899
- Aegista tenuissima (Pilsbry & Hirase, 1908)
- Aegista tokyoensis Sorita, 1980
- Aegista tumida (Gude, 1901)
- Aegista vermis (Reeve, 1852)

== Synonyms ==
- Aegista aemula (Gude, 1900): synonym of Plectotropis aemula (Gude, 1900)
- Aegista bonnieri (H. Fischer, 1898): synonym of Plectotropis bonnieri (H. Fischer, 1898)
- Aegista chondroderma (O.F. von Möllendorff, 1900): synonym of Plectotropis chondroderma Möllendorff, 1900
- Aegista coeni Preston, 1914: synonym of Landouria coeni (Preston, 1914) (original combination)
- Aegista conomphala Pilsbry & Y. Hirase, 1903: synonym of Plectotropis conomphala Pilsbry & Y. Hirase, 1903
- Aegista elegantissima (L. Pfeiffer, 1849) : synonym of Plectotropis elegantissima (L. Pfeiffer, 1849)
- Aegista emma (L. Pfeiffer, 1863): synonym of Ganesella emma (L. Pfeiffer, 1863) (unaccepted > superseded combination)
- Aegista gerlachi E.C. Von Martens, 1881: synonym of Plectotropis gerlachi (E. von Martens, 1881)
- Aegista grumulus Godwin-Austen, 1891: synonym of Landouria grumulus (Godwin-Austen, 1891)
- Aegista horrida (Pilsbry, 1900): synonym of Plectotropis horrida (Pilsbry, 1900)
- Aegista inexpectata Kuroda & Minato, 1977: synonym of Plectotropis inexpectata (Kuroda & Minato, 1977)
- Aegista inornata (H.A. Pilsbry, 1901): synonym of Plectotropis osbeckii (R. A. Philippi, 1847)
- Aegista kiusiuensis (Pilsbry, 1900): synonym of Plectotropis kiusiuensis (Pilsbry, 1900)
- Aegista lepidophora (Gude, 1900): synonym of Plectotropis lepidophora (Gude, 1900)
- Aegista mackensii (A. Adams & Reeve, 1850) : synonym of Plectotropis mackensii (Adams & Reeve, 1850)
- Aegista martensiana (H.A. Pilsbry, 1901): synonym of Aegista (Aegista) squarrosa squarrosa (A. Gould, 1859): synonym of Aegista squarrosa squarrosa (A. Gould, 1859)
- Aegista mesasiana (Lindholm, 1927): synonym of Paedhoplita lentina (E. von Martens, 1885) (junior subjective synonym)
- Aegista marginata (Pilsbry & Y. Hirase, 1903): synonym of Plectotropis marginata (Pilsbry & Y. Hirase, 1903)
- Aegista mimula (H.A. Pilsbry, 1901): synonym of Aegista proba mimula (Pilsbry, 1900)
- Aegista omiensis (Pilsbry, 1901): synonym of Plectotropis omiensis (Pilsbry, 1902)
- Aegista pannosa (Pilsbry, 1902): synonym of Plectotropis pannosa (Pilsbry, 1902)
- Aegista scepasma (Reeve, 1854): synonym of Plectotropis scepasma (Reeve, 1854)
- Aegista tenella (L. Pfeiffer, 1862) : synonym of Chloritis tenella (L. Pfeiffer, 1862) (subsequent combination)
- Aegista tokunoshimana Pilsbry & Y. Hirase, 1904: synonym of Aegista squarrosa tokunoshimana (Pilsbry & Y. Hirase, 1904)
- Aegista trichotropis (L. Pfeiffer, 1850): synonym of Plectotropis trichotropis (L. Pfeiffer, 1850)
- Aegista trochula (A. Adams, 1868): synonym of Neoaegista trochula (A. Adams, 1868)
- Aegista visayana (Möllendorf, 1888): synonym of Plectotropis visayana (Möllendorff, 1888)
- Aegista vulgivaga(P.B. Schmacker & O. Böttger, 1890): synonym of Plectotropis vulgivaga (Schmacker & O. Boettger, 1890)

Taxon inquirendum

- Aegista delectabilis (P. Ehrmann, 1900): synonym of Plectotropis delectabilis Ehrmann, 1900 (uncertain, unassessed)
- Aegista shermani L. Pfeiffer, 1866 sensu Huang et al. (2014) taxon inquirendum, based on a misidentification; not Helix shermani L. Pfeiffer, 1866)
