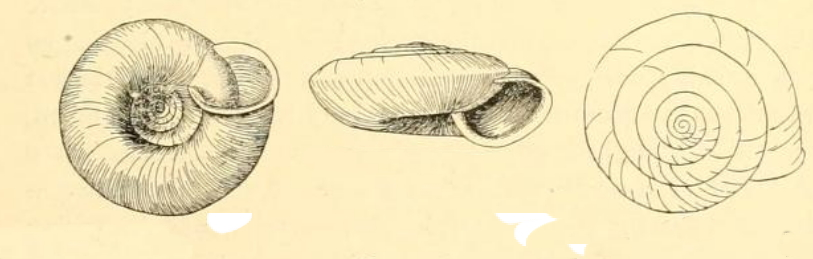
- Shell of Aegista tenuissima (holotype)

Scientific classification
- Kingdom: Animalia
- Phylum: Mollusca
- Class: Gastropoda
- Order: Stylommatophora
- Family: Camaenidae
- Subfamily: Bradybaeninae
- Tribe: Aegistini
- Genus: Aegista
- Species: A. tenuissima

Binomial name
- Aegista tenuissima (Pilsbry & Y. Hirase, 1908)

Synonyms
- Aegista tenuissima omorii Kuroda, 1936 (junior synonym); Eulota (Aegista) tenuissima Pilsbry & Hirase, 1908 (original combination)

= Aegista tenuissima =

Species of gastropod

Aegista tenuissima is a species of air-breathing land snails, a terrestrial pulmonate gastropod in the family Camaenidae.

== Description ==
The diameter of the shell attains 23 mm, its height 9.7 mm.

The thin shell exhibits a delicate, lightweight structure, taking on a disc-like form with a gently curved spire and distinct angular periphery. Its hue is a pale yellowish-brown, lending it a translucent quality. The broad umbilicus offers a unique perspective, encompassing fully one-third of the shell's diameter. The surface of the shell boasts a glossy sheen, adorned with fine, irregular striations and subtle spiral patterns. The shell contains 6½ whorls, each slowly and regularly expanding. The body whorl descends slightly at the front and flattens beneath the peripheral angle before rounding off at the base. The aperture is quite oblique and predominantly rounded. It bears a subtle lunate shape. The diameter and oblique height are equal. Encircling this opening is a narrowly reflexed peristome, delicately thin, with a faint white thickening present within.

== Distribution ==
This species occurs in Korea.
