= Aegista kunimiensis =

Scientific classification
- Kingdom: Animalia
- Phylum: Mollusca
- Class: Gastropoda
- Order: Stylommatophora
- Family: Camaenidae
- Genus: Aegista
- Species: A. kunimiensis

Binomial name
- Aegista kunimiensis M. Azuma & Y. Azuma, 1982

Synonyms
- Aegista (Aegista) kunimiensis M. Azuma & Y. Azuma, 1982 (no subgenera are recognized)

Species of gastropod

Aegista kunimiensis is a species of air-breathing land snails, a terrestrial pulmonate gastropod in the family Camaenidae.

== Distribution and habitat ==
This shell occurs in Japan and Korea.

It is a terrestrial species that has been collected in Sasa and Fagus leaf litter at 700 m (2,300 ft) above sea level.

== Description ==
The shell is thin and small, reaching 6 mm (0.24 in) in height and 9.8 mm (0.39 in) in breadth. There are up to 5¼ whorls. The spire is low and the umbilicus is deep. The color is dark reddish brown.
