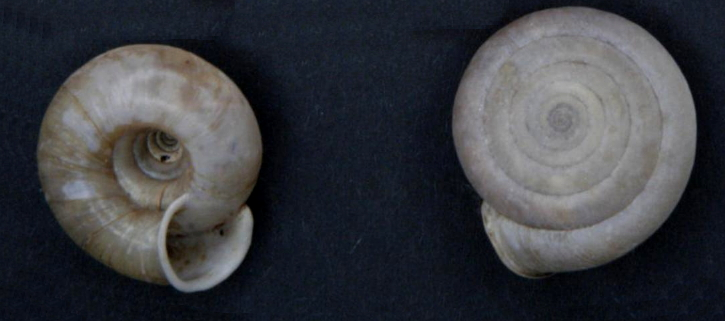
- Shell of Aegista chinensis (specimen at Naturalis Biodiversity Center)

Scientific classification
- Kingdom: Animalia
- Phylum: Mollusca
- Class: Gastropoda
- Order: Stylommatophora
- Family: Camaenidae
- Subfamily: Bradybaeninae
- Tribe: Aegistini
- Genus: Aegista
- Species: A. chinensis

Binomial name
- Aegista chinensis (R. A. Philippi, 1845)
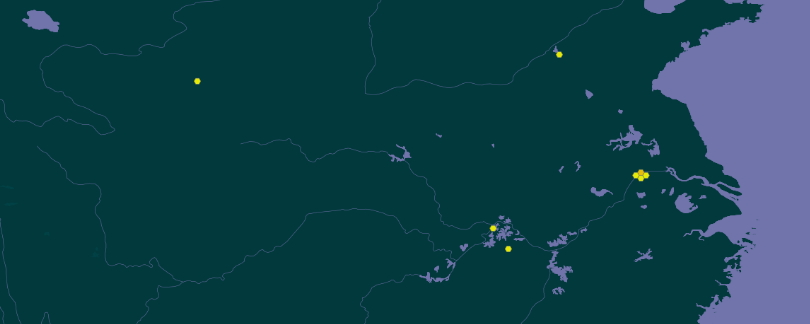

Synonyms
- Helix chinensis R. A. Philippi, 1845 superseded combination

= Aegista chinensis =

Species of gastropod

Aegista chinensis is a species of air-breathing land snails, a terrestrial pulmonate gastropod in the family Camaenidae.

== Description ==
The diameter of the shell attains 25 mm.

The shell exhibits a wide umbilicus, gleaming with a translucent quality. It is adorned with delicate striations. Its upper surface boasts a radiant fulvous hue, while its underside is whitish. The shell's epidermis is thin and remarkably fleeting. With eight gently convex whorls that increase gradually, it presents a graceful profile. The peristome is distinguished by its white color, slightly lipped, and gently turned inward.

== Distribution ==
This species occurs in China and Japan.
