= Aegista furtiva =

Scientific classification
- Domain: Eukaryota
- Kingdom: Animalia
- Phylum: Mollusca
- Class: Gastropoda
- Order: Stylommatophora
- Family: Camaenidae
- Subfamily: Bradybaeninae
- Tribe: Aegistini
- Genus: Aegista
- Species: A. furtiva

Binomial name
- Aegista furtiva (Heude, 1885)

Synonyms
- Helix furtiva Heude, 1885 (original combination)

Species of gastropod

Aegista furtiva is a species of air-breathing land snails, a terrestrial pulmonate gastropod in the family Camaenidae.

== Description ==
The diameter of the shell attains 19 mm.

The shell exhibits a moderate umbilicus, with a corneous texture. The shell shows delicate striations, while its suture bears a slight impression. Across its six whorls, there's a gradual increase, culminating in a slender body whorl with a faintly angled periphery. Its peristome, expanding gracefully, presents a striking contrast in white.

== Distribution ==
This species occurs in China, Guangxi province.
