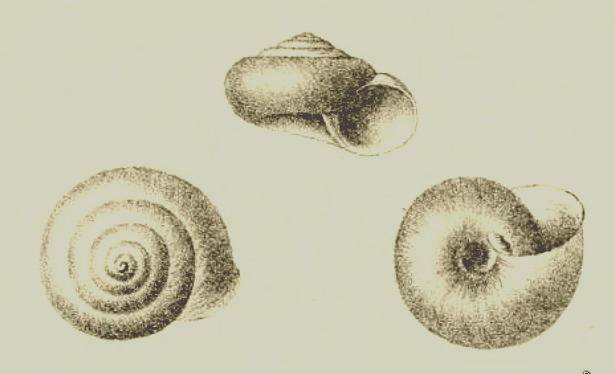
- Shell of Aegista tenerrima (holotype)

Scientific classification
- Kingdom: Animalia
- Phylum: Mollusca
- Class: Gastropoda
- Order: Stylommatophora
- Family: Camaenidae
- Genus: Aegista
- Species: A. tenerrima

Binomial name
- Aegista tenerrima Möllendorff, 1899

= Aegista tenerrima =

Species of gastropod

Aegista tenerrima is a species of air-breathing land snails, a terrestrial pulmonate gastropod in the family Camaenidae.

== Description ==
The diameter of the shell attains 18 mm, its height is 11 mm.

== Distribution ==
This species occurs in China.
