= Aegista fausta =

Scientific classification
- Kingdom: Animalia
- Phylum: Mollusca
- Class: Gastropoda
- Order: Stylommatophora
- Family: Camaenidae
- Genus: Aegista
- Species: A. fausta

Binomial name
- Aegista fausta Kuroda & T. Habe, 1951
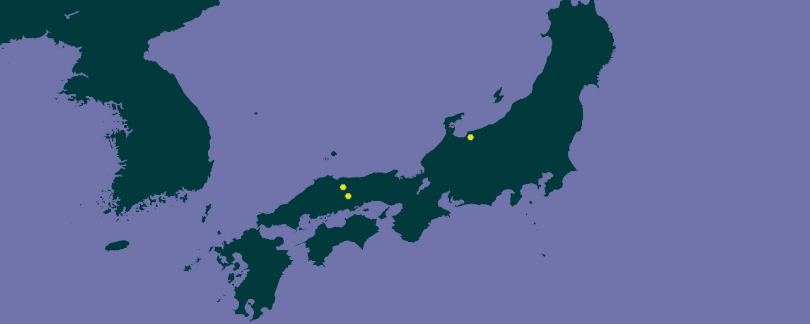

Synonyms
- Aegista (Aegista) fausta Kuroda & Habe, 1951 (no subgenera are recognized)

Species of gastropod

Aegista fausta is a species of air-breathing land snails, a terrestrial pulmonate gastropod in the family Camaenidae.

== Distribution and habitat ==
This species occurs in Japan.
