= Aegista gitaena =

Scientific classification
- Kingdom: Animalia
- Phylum: Mollusca
- Class: Gastropoda
- Order: Stylommatophora
- Family: Camaenidae
- Genus: Aegista
- Species: A. gitaena

Binomial name
- Aegista gitaena (Bavay & Dautzenberg, 1908)

Synonyms
- Helix (Plectotropis) gitaena Bavay & Dautzenberg, 1909 (original combination); Plectotropis gitaena (Bavay & Dautzenberg, 1909) (unaccepted combination)

Species of gastropod

Aegista gitaena is a species of air-breathing land snails, a terrestrial pulmonate gastropod in the family Camaenidae.

== Distribution and habitat ==
This species occurs in Vietnam and Laos.
