= Aegista phayrei =

Scientific classification
- Domain: Eukaryota
- Kingdom: Animalia
- Phylum: Mollusca
- Class: Gastropoda
- Order: Stylommatophora
- Family: Camaenidae
- Genus: Aegista
- Species: A. phayrei

Binomial name
- Aegista phayrei (Theobald, 1859)

Synonyms
- Helix (Plectotropis) phayrei Theobald, 1859 (unaccepted combination); Helix phayrei Theobald, 1859 (original combination)

Species of gastropod

Aegista phayrei is a species of air-breathing land snails, a terrestrial pulmonate gastropod in the family Camaenidae.

== Description ==
(Original description in Latin) The shell is lenticular and funnel-shaped with an obtuse keel. It features strong striations with curved, confluent transverse lines. It has six distinct, convex whorls. The suture is impressed. The aperture is oblique and nearly square in shape. The peristome is thin and reflexed.

== Distribution ==
This species occurs in Myanmar.
