= Aegista laurentii =

Scientific classification
- Domain: Eukaryota
- Kingdom: Animalia
- Phylum: Mollusca
- Class: Gastropoda
- Order: Stylommatophora
- Family: Camaenidae
- Genus: Aegista
- Species: A. laurentii

Binomial name
- Aegista laurentii (Gredler, 18867

Synonyms
- Helix laurentii Gredler, 1887 (original combination)

Species of gastropod

Aegista laurentii is a species of air-breathing land snails, a terrestrial pulmonate gastropod in the family Camaenidae.

== Description ==
The diameter of the shell is 11 mm, its height 6 mm.

(Original description in Latin) The shell is slightly umbilicate and convex-globose, featuring uneven striations. It is thin, transparent, and shiny, with a color similar to that of the cornea. There are 4.5 convex whorls that ascend more rapidly, and have an enlarged body whorl that does not descend anteriorly. The suture is impressed. The aperture is broad, rounded, and slightly oblique. The peristome is expanded, not reflexed, and barely thickened.

== Distribution ==
This species occurs in China.
