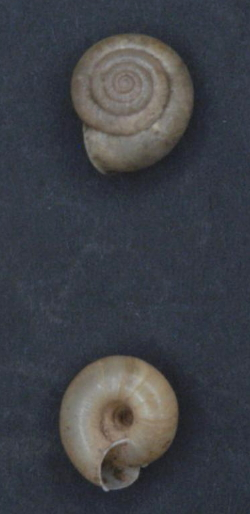
- Shell of Aegista herpestes (specimen at Naturalis Biodiversity Center)

Scientific classification
- Domain: Eukaryota
- Kingdom: Animalia
- Phylum: Mollusca
- Class: Gastropoda
- Order: Stylommatophora
- Family: Camaenidae
- Subfamily: Bradybaeninae
- Tribe: Aegistini
- Genus: Aegista
- Species: A. herpestes

Binomial name
- Aegista herpestes (Heude, 1885)

Synonyms
- Helix herpestes Heude, 1885

= Aegista herpestes =

Species of gastropod

Aegista herpestes is a species of air-breathing land snails, a terrestrial pulmonate gastropod in the family Camaenidae.

== Description ==
The diameter of the shell attains 22 mm.

The shell features a broad umbilicus and exhibits a hue reminiscent of brownish horn, adorned with a subtle, indistinct whitish band of the same material. Its epidermis is brownish or whitish. The shell is intricately marked with closely set oblique striations. The shell shows seven gradually expanding whorls. The body whorl displays a faint angulation. The white peristome is delicately turned inward.

== Distribution ==
This species occurs in China.
