= Aegista squarrosa =

Scientific classification
- Kingdom: Animalia
- Phylum: Mollusca
- Class: Gastropoda
- Order: Stylommatophora
- Family: Camaenidae
- Genus: Aegista
- Species: A. squarrosa

Binomial name
- Aegista squarrosa (A. Gould, 1859)
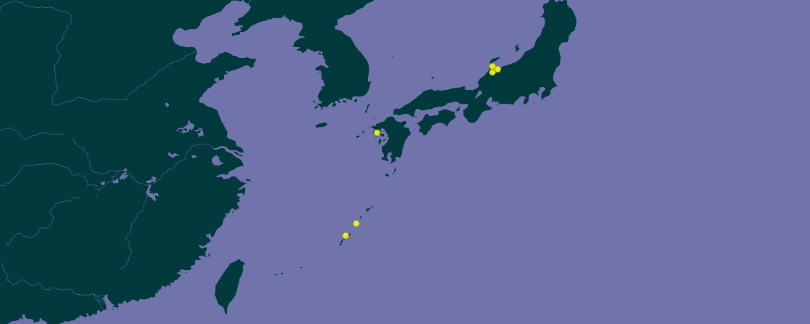

Synonyms
- Aegista (Aegista) squarrosa (A. Gould, 1859) (no subgenera are recognized); Helix squarrosa A. Gould, 1859 (original combination)

Species of gastropod

Aegista squarrosa is a species of air-breathing land snails, a terrestrial pulmonate gastropod in the family Camaenidae.

Subspecies

- Aegista squarrosa squarrosa (A. Gould, 1859)
- Aegista squarrosa tokunoshimana (Pilsbry & Y. Hirase, 1904)

== Description ==
(Original description in Latin) The shell is planorboid and somewhat squarish, with a coloration that is ochreous-corneous and paler on the underside. It has a convex shape and a broad umbilicus. There are six whorls that are convex and subangular at the periphery. The aperture is small, narrow, and lunate, with a simple peristome that is reflexed towards the columella.

== Distribution ==
This species occurs on the Ryukyu Islands, Japan, and Korea.
