= Aegista tadai =

Scientific classification
- Kingdom: Animalia
- Phylum: Mollusca
- Class: Gastropoda
- Order: Stylommatophora
- Family: Camaenidae
- Genus: Aegista
- Species: A. tadai

Binomial name
- Aegista tadai Minato, 1983

Species of gastropod

Aegista tadai is a species of air-breathing land snails, a terrestrial pulmonate gastropod in the family Camaenidae.

== Distribution ==
This species occurs in Japan.
