= Aegista granti =

Scientific classification
- Kingdom: Animalia
- Phylum: Mollusca
- Class: Gastropoda
- Order: Stylommatophora
- Family: Camaenidae
- Genus: Aegista
- Species: A. granti

Binomial name
- Aegista granti (L. Pfeiffer, 1865)
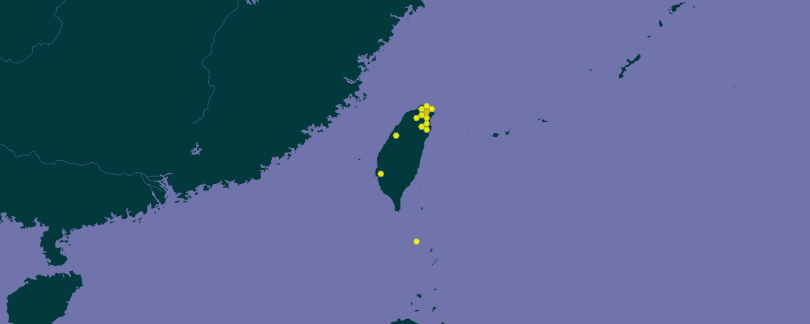

Synonyms
- Helix granti L. Pfeiffer, 1866 (original combination)

Species of gastropod

Aegista granti is a species of air-breathing land snails, a terrestrial pulmonate gastropod in the family Camaenidae.

== Distribution and habitat ==
This species occurs in Taiwan.
