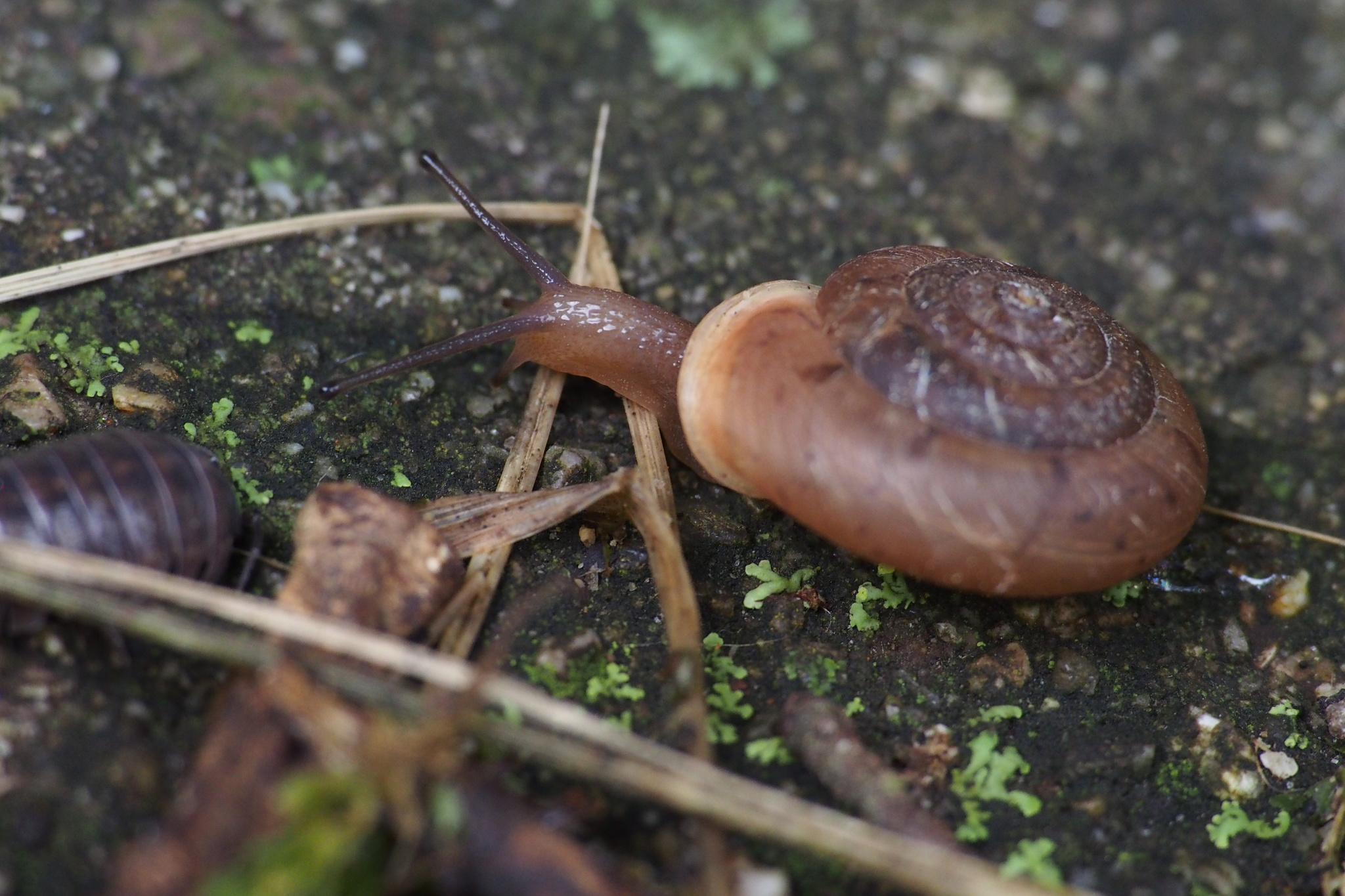

Scientific classification
- Kingdom: Animalia
- Phylum: Mollusca
- Class: Gastropoda
- Order: Stylommatophora
- Family: Camaenidae
- Genus: Aegista
- Species: A. kobensis

Binomial name
- Aegista kobensis (Schmacker & O. Boettger, 1890)

Synonyms
- Aegista (Aegista) kobensis (Schmacker & O. Boettger, 1890) (no subgenera are recognized); Eulota (Aegista) kobensis (Schmacker & O. Boettger, 1890) (unaccepted combination); Helix (Aegista) kobensis Schmacker & O. Boettger, 1890 (invalid; not O. Boettger, 1883)

= Aegista kobensis =

Species of gastropod

Aegista kobensis is a species of air-breathing land snails, a terrestrial pulmonate gastropod in the family Camaenidae.

The name is accepted as an unreplaced junior homonym (based on unavailable original name; gotoensis appears to be the earliest available name)

Subspecies

- Aegista kobensis discus (Pilsbry & Y. Hirase, 1904)
- Aegista kobensis gotoensis (Pilsbry & Y. Hirase, 1902)
- Aegista kobensis kobensis (Schmacker & O. Boettger, 1890)
- Aegista kobensis koshikijimana (Pilsbry & Y. Hirase, 1904)
- Aegista kobensis pertenuis (Pilsbry & Y. Hirase, 1904)
- Aegista kobensis tsumiyamai Kuroda & T. Habe, 1951

== Distribution ==
This species is found in Japan and Korea.
