= Aegista inrinensis =

Scientific classification
- Kingdom: Animalia
- Phylum: Mollusca
- Class: Gastropoda
- Order: Stylommatophora
- Family: Camaenidae
- Genus: Aegista
- Species: A. inrinensis

Binomial name
- Aegista inrinensis (Pilsbry & Hirase, 1905)

Synonyms
- Aegista (Plectotropis) inrinensis (Pilsbry & Hirase, 1905) · alternative representation; Eulota (Plectotropis) inrinensis Pilsbry & Hirase, 1905 (original combination)

Species of gastropod

Aegista inrinensis is a species of air-breathing land snails, a terrestrial pulmonate gastropod in the family Camaenidae.

== Description ==
The diameter of the shell attains 8.9 mm, its height 5 mm.

The shell assumes a depressed-trochiform shape. It is characterized by its thinness and umbilicate nature, with the umbilicus narrow and contracting rapidly within, measuring less than one-fifth the diameter of the shell. The coloration of the shell is a pale brownish-corneous, lacking luster. The shell shows slight, delicate spiral striations, barely discernible above but more pronounced below. The spire is low-conic, featuring nearly straight outlines. The shell contains approximately 5¼ to 5½ whorls, each somewhat convex. The body whorl is sharply carinated at the periphery, convex beneath, and exhibits a slight descent towards the front. The aperture is quite oblique. The peristome is thin and narrowly expanded. The basal margin curves deeply in an arcuate fashion and is reflexed. The columellar margin is dilated above.

== Distribution ==
This species occurs in Taiwan.
