= Aegista caerulea =

Scientific classification
- Kingdom: Animalia
- Phylum: Mollusca
- Class: Gastropoda
- Order: Stylommatophora
- Family: Camaenidae
- Genus: Aegista
- Species: A. caerulea

Binomial name
- Aegista caerulea Kuroda & T. Habe, 1960

Synonyms
- Aegista (Aegista) caerulea Kuroda & Habe, 1960 (no subgenera are recognized)

Species of gastropod

Aegista caerulea is a species of air-breathing land snails, a terrestrial pulmonate gastropod in the family Camaenidae.

== Distribution and habitat ==
This shell occurs on the Ryukyu Islands, Japan. and Korea
