= Aegista hebes =

Scientific classification
- Kingdom: Animalia
- Phylum: Mollusca
- Class: Gastropoda
- Order: Stylommatophora
- Family: Camaenidae
- Genus: Aegista
- Species: A. hebes

Binomial name
- Aegista hebes (Pilsbry & Hirase, 1905)

Synonyms
- Aegista (Plectotropis) hebes (Pilsbry & Hirase, 1905) · alternative representation; Eulota (Plectotropis) hebes Pilsbry & Hirase, 1905 (original combination)

Species of gastropod

Aegista hebes is a species of air-breathing land snails, a terrestrial pulmonate gastropod in the family Camaenidae.

== Description ==
The diameter of the shell attains 7 mm, its height 5.4 mm.

The shell exhibits a trochiform shape, characterized by its delicate thinness and an evident umbilicus. Its hue is a pale brown, with a subtle sheen. The shell shows faint striae and barely discernible spiral markings beneath. The spire rises conically, culminating in an obtuse apex. The shell comprises 5½ whorls, each gently convex. The body whorl is notably carinated at the periphery, with a projecting yet rounded keel, gradually diminishing in prominence towards the aperture and displaying a slight descent anteriorly. The aperture presents an oblique, broadly lunate shape. The peristome is thin and narrowly expanded. The columellar margin widens slightly above, while the basal margin curves deeply in an arcuate fashion.

== Distribution ==
This species occurs in Taiwan.
