= Aegista permellita =

Scientific classification
- Kingdom: Animalia
- Phylum: Mollusca
- Class: Gastropoda
- Order: Stylommatophora
- Family: Camaenidae
- Subfamily: Bradybaeninae
- Tribe: Aegistini
- Genus: Aegista
- Species: A. permellita

Binomial name
- Aegista permellita (Heude, 1886)
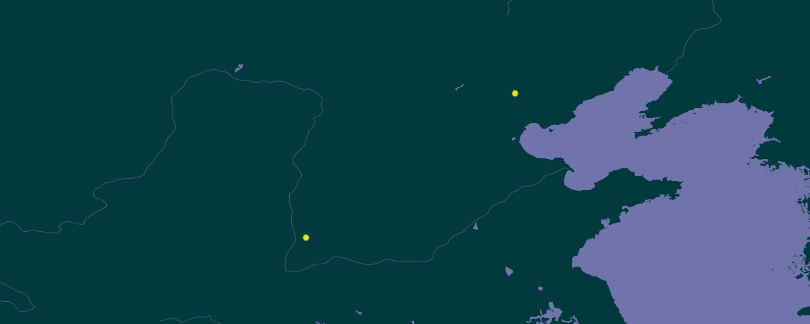

Synonyms
- Aegista (Aegista) permellita (Heude, 1886) (no subgenera are recognized); Helix permellita Heude, 1886 (original combination)

Species of gastropod

Aegista permellita is a species of air-breathing land snails, a terrestrial pulmonate gastropod in the family Camaenidae.

== Description ==
The diameter of the shell attains 15 mm, its height is 9 mm.

== Distribution ==
This species occurs in China.
