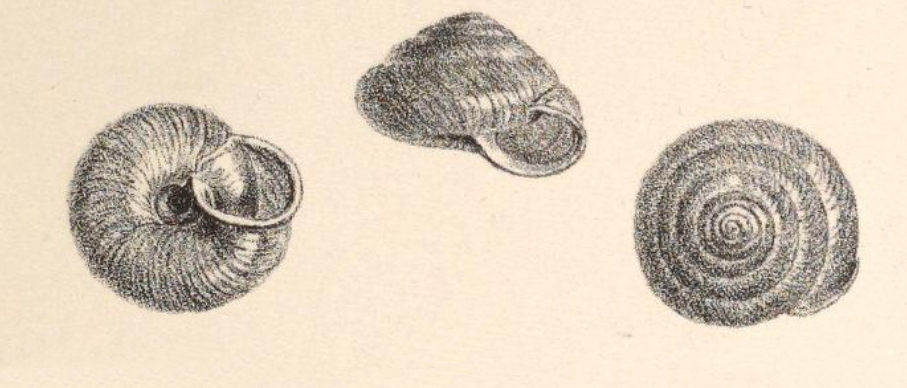
- Shell of Aegista serpestes (holotype)

Scientific classification
- Domain: Eukaryota
- Kingdom: Animalia
- Phylum: Mollusca
- Class: Gastropoda
- Order: Stylommatophora
- Family: Camaenidae
- Genus: Aegista
- Species: A. serpestes

Binomial name
- Aegista serpestes (Heude, 1890)

Synonyms
- Helix serpestes Heude, 1890 (original combination)

= Aegista serpestes =

Species of gastropod

Aegista serpestes is a species of air-breathing land snails, a terrestrial pulmonate gastropod in the family Camaenidae.

== Description ==
The shell attains a diameter of 18 mm (0.7 in), and a height of 13 mm (0.5 in).

== Distribution ==
This species occurs in China.
