= Aegista pygmaea =

Scientific classification
- Kingdom: Animalia
- Phylum: Mollusca
- Class: Gastropoda
- Order: Stylommatophora
- Family: Camaenidae
- Genus: Aegista
- Species: A. pygmaea

Binomial name
- Aegista pygmaea Kuroda & Kawamoto, 1956

Synonyms
- Aegista (Aegista) pygmaea Kuroda & Kawamoto, 1956 (no subgenera are recognized)

Species of gastropod

Aegista pygmaea is a species of air-breathing land snails, a terrestrial pulmonate gastropod in the family Camaenidae.

== Distribution ==
This species occurs in Japan.
