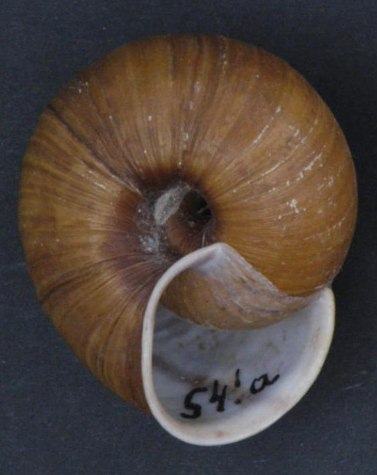
- Shell of Aegista awajiensis (specimen at Naturalis Biodiversity Center)

Scientific classification
- Kingdom: Animalia
- Phylum: Mollusca
- Class: Gastropoda
- Order: Stylommatophora
- Family: Camaenidae
- Genus: Aegista
- Species: A. awajiensis

Binomial name
- Aegista awajiensis (Gude, 1900)
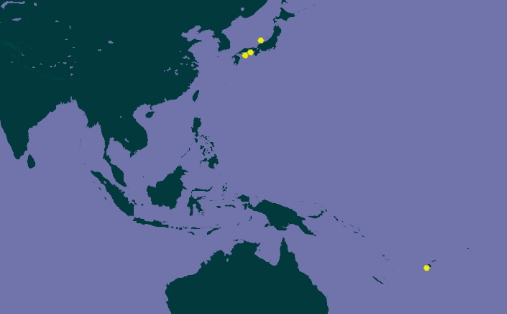

Synonyms
- Aegista (Aegista) awajiensis (Gude, 1900) (no subgenera are recognized); Eulota (Aegista) awajiensis Gude, 1900 (original combination)

= Aegista awajiensis =

Species of gastropod

Aegista awajiensis is a species of air-breathing land snails, a terrestrial pulmonate gastropod in the family Camaenidae.

== Distribution and habitat ==
This shell occurs on Awaji Island, Japan, Korea, and in Fiji.

== Description ==
The diameter of the shell is 13.5 mm, its height 8 mm.

The shell is widely and deeply umbilicated, with a conoid and depressed shape and is dark horn-colored. The shell is finely striated. The spire is conical with a prominent apex and an impressed suture. It has six whorls that increase slowly and are slightly convex. The body whorl is rather flattened above, rounded below, bluntly keeled, and very shortly deflected in front. The aperture is oblique and ovate, with a shining white peristome that is strongly thickened and shortly reflected. The margins approach and are united by a thin callus, with the columellar margin being subvertical. The umbilicus is wide and perspective.
