= Aegista nikkoensis =

Scientific classification
- Kingdom: Animalia
- Phylum: Mollusca
- Class: Gastropoda
- Order: Stylommatophora
- Family: Camaenidae
- Genus: Aegista
- Species: A. nikkoensis

Binomial name
- Aegista nikkoensis Kuroda, 1982
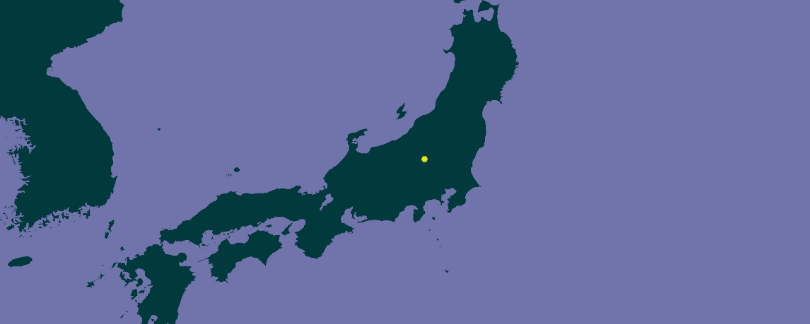

Synonyms
- Aegista (Aegista) nikkoensis Kuroda, 1982 (no subgenera are recognized)

Species of gastropod

Aegista nikkoensis is a species of air-breathing land snails, a terrestrial pulmonate gastropod in the family Camaenidae.

== Distribution ==
This shell occurs in Japan.
