= Aegista mayasana =

Scientific classification
- Kingdom: Animalia
- Phylum: Mollusca
- Class: Gastropoda
- Order: Stylommatophora
- Family: Camaenidae
- Genus: Aegista
- Species: A. mayasana

Binomial name
- Aegista mayasana M. Azuma, 1969
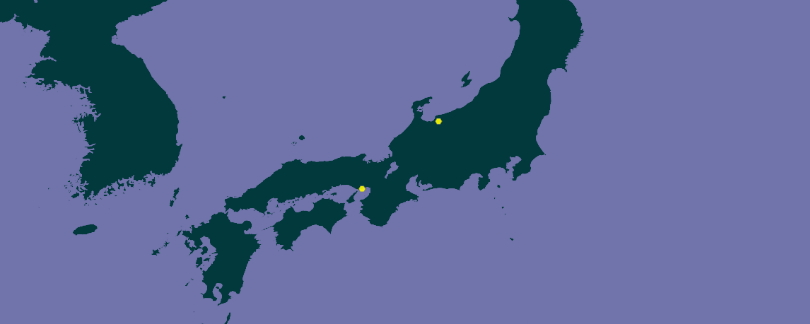

Synonyms
- Aegista (Aegista) mayasana (M. Azuma, 1969) (no subgenera are recognized); Trishoplita mayasana M. Azuma, 1969 superseded combination

Species of gastropod

Aegista mayasana is a species of air-breathing land snails, a terrestrial pulmonate gastropod in the family Camaenidae.

== Distribution ==
This shell occurs on Mount Maya, Japan.
