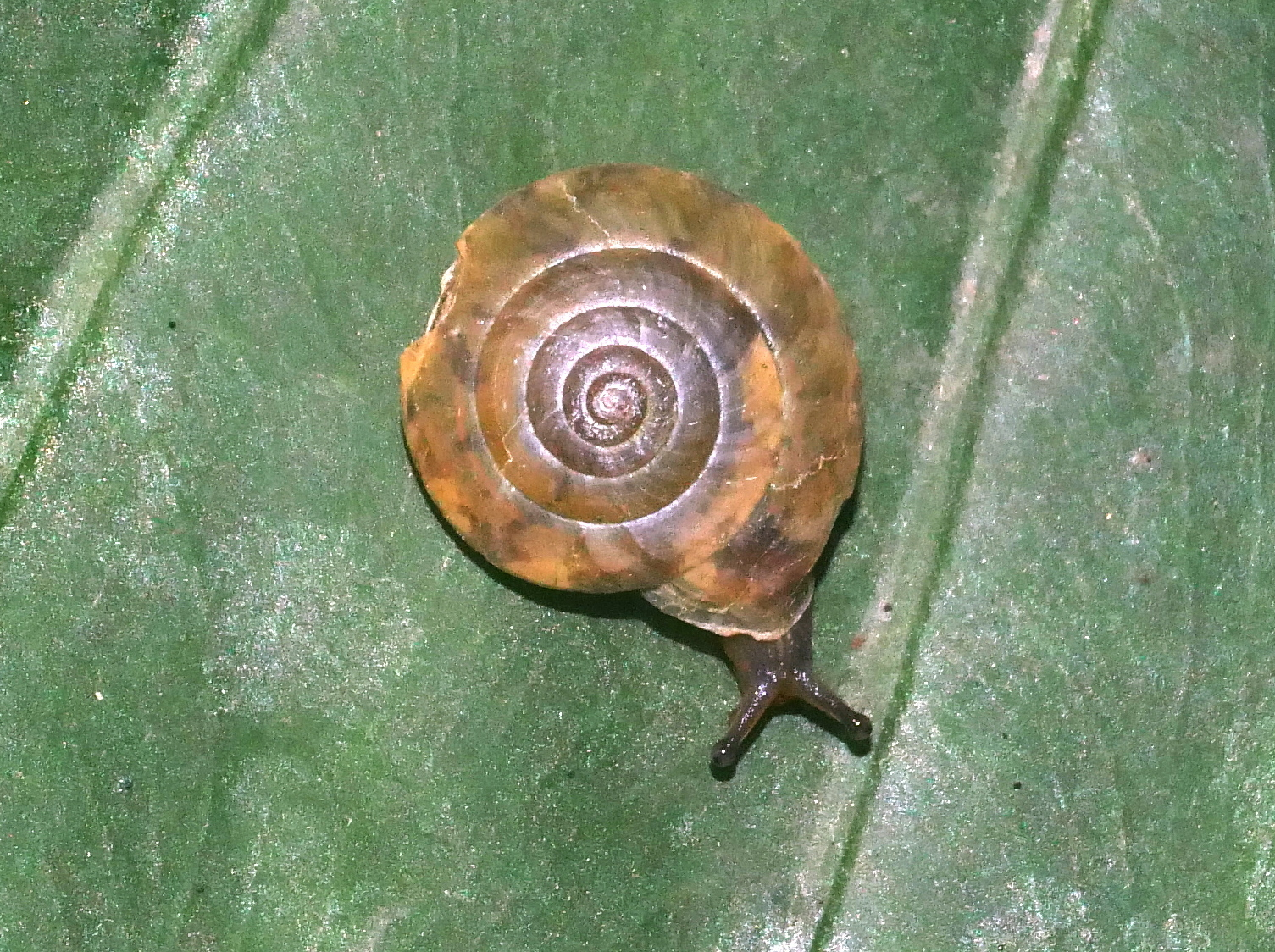
- In Taiwan

Scientific classification
- Kingdom: Animalia
- Phylum: Mollusca
- Class: Gastropoda
- Order: Stylommatophora
- Family: Camaenidae
- Genus: Aegista
- Species: A. lautsi

Binomial name
- Aegista lautsi (Schmacker & O. Boettger, 1890)

Synonyms
- Aegista (Plectotropis) lautsi (Schmacker & O. Boettger, 1890) · alternative representation; Aegista (Plectotropis) lautsi lautsi (Schmacker & O. Boettger, 1890) · alternative representation; Eulota (Plectotropis) lautsi (Schmacker & O. Boettger, 1890) (unaccepted combination); Eulota lautsi (Schmacker & O. Boettger, 1890) (unaccepted combination); Helix (Plectotropis) lautsi Schmacker & O. Boettger, 1890 (basionym); Helix (Plectotropis) shermani var. lautsi Schmacker & O. Boettger, 1891 (original combination and rank)

= Aegista lautsi =

Species of gastropod

Aegista lautsi is a species of air-breathing land snails, a terrestrial pulmonate gastropod in the family Camaenidae.

== Taxonomy ==
Subspecies include:

- Aegista lautsi brachylasia (Schmacker & O. Boettger, 1891)
- Aegista lautsi lautsi (Schmacker & O. Boettger, 1890)
- Aegista lautsi micra (Pilsbry & Hirase, 1906)

== Description ==
The diameter of the shell reaches 22 mm (0.9 in), the height 8.5 mm (0.3 in).

(Original description in Latin) The thin shell is slightly umbilicate and conical-depressed, with a sharply carinate structure. It is corneous yellowish in color. The spire is slightly raised and convex-conical, with an obtuse apex. There are 6.5 to 7 rather flat whorls. The suture is impressed. The surface is slightly striated and very densely spirally lined. The last keel is subcompressed, lined with white, and flat beneath, with spiral impressions near the keel, sloping towards the umbilicus, and slightly descending anteriorly. The aperture is oblique and rounded-rhombic, angled to the right, with widely separated edges. The top of the aperture is barely reflexed, slightly arched, and curved at the bottom, with the peristome reflexed and slightly thickened. The columellar margin is subvertical and very triangular, extending above.

== Distribution ==
This species occurs in Taiwan.
