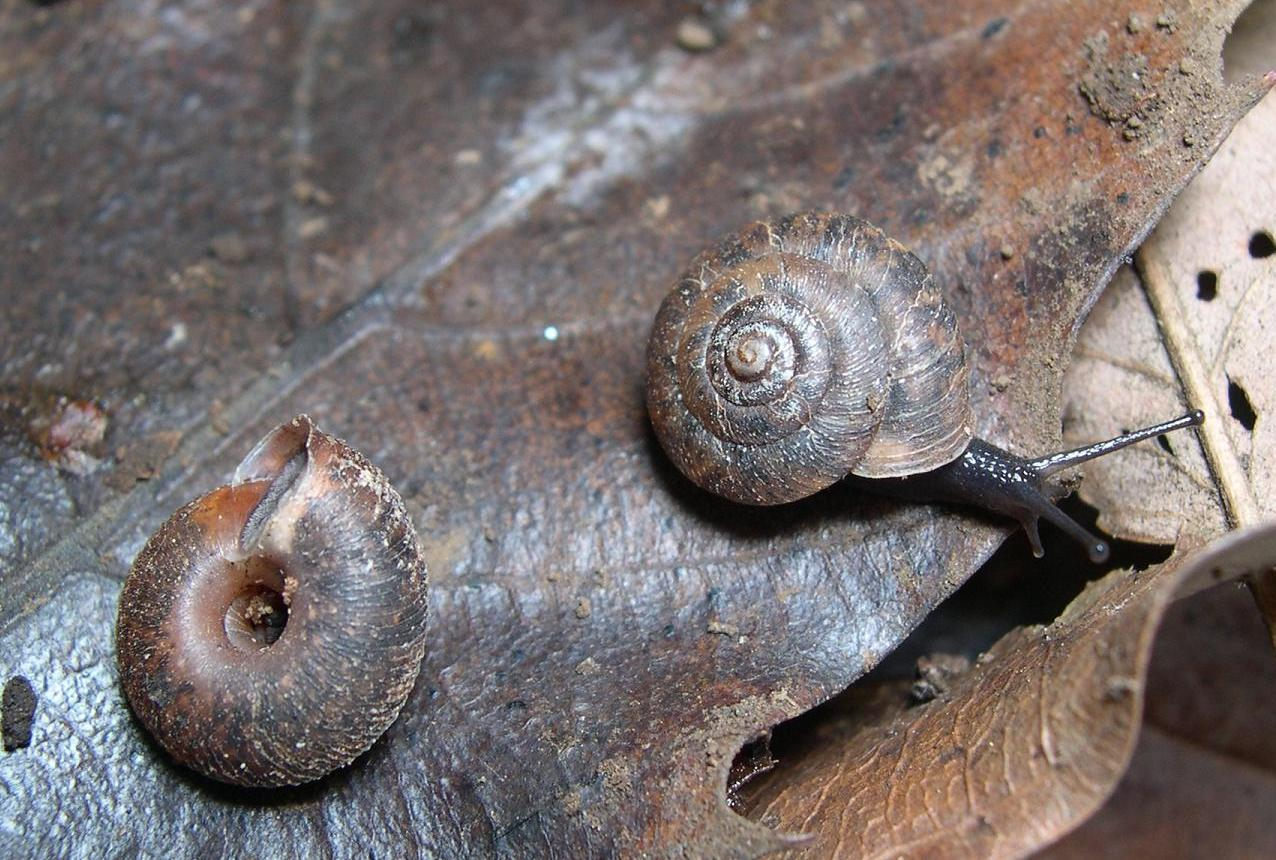
- Shell of Aegista tokyoensis (from the Koishikawa Botanical Garden, Tokyo)

Scientific classification
- Kingdom: Animalia
- Phylum: Mollusca
- Class: Gastropoda
- Order: Stylommatophora
- Family: Camaenidae
- Genus: Aegista
- Species: A. tokyoensis

Binomial name
- Aegista tokyoensis Sorita, 1980

Synonyms
- Aegista (Aegista) tokyoensis Sorita, 1980 (no subgenera are recognized)

= Aegista tokyoensis =

Species of gastropod

Aegista tokyoensis is a species of air-breathing land snail, a terrestrial pulmonate gastropod mollusk in the family Camaenidae.

Subspecies: Aegista tokyoensis choshiensis Sakurai & Sorita, 1982

== Distribution ==
This snail occurs in Japan.
