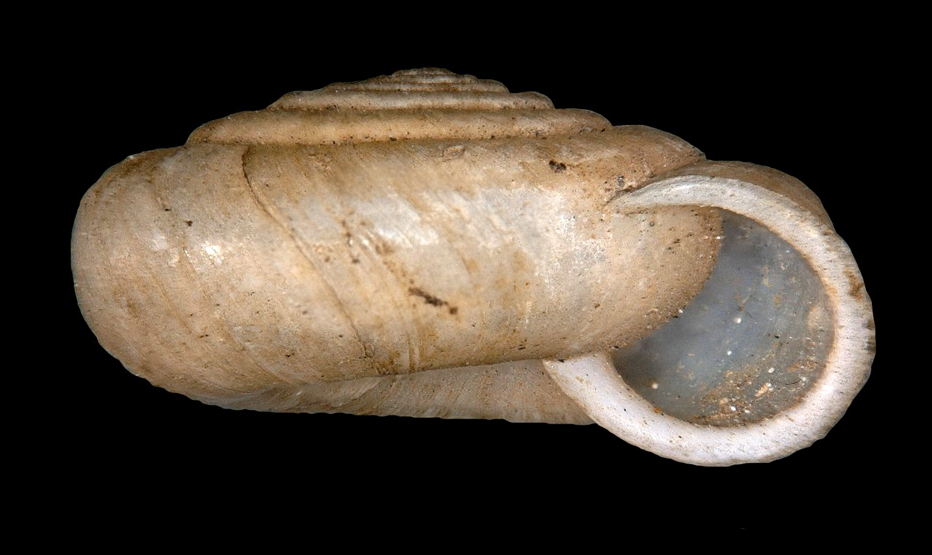
- Shell of Aegista accrescens (syntype at the Harvard University Museum of Comparative Zoology)

Scientific classification
- Domain: Eukaryota
- Kingdom: Animalia
- Phylum: Mollusca
- Class: Gastropoda
- Order: Stylommatophora
- Family: Camaenidae
- Subfamily: Bradybaeninae
- Tribe: Aegistini
- Genus: Aegista
- Species: A. accrescens

Binomial name
- Aegista accrescens (Heude, 1882)

Synonyms
- Helix accrescens Heude, 1882 (original combination)

= Aegista accrescens =

Species of gastropod

Aegista accrescens is a species of air-breathing land snails, a terrestrial pulmonate gastropod in the family Camaenidae.

Subspecies

- Aegista accrescens accrescens (Heude, 1882)
- Aegista accrescens initialis (Heude, 1882)

== Description ==
The diameter of the shell attains 16.5 mm.

The shell is widely umbilicated. It is thin, pellucid corneous, with a whitish peripheral band. The shell contains seven whorls. These are narrow, slightly convex and slowly increasing. The body whorl is obtusely angulated. The peristome is white and narrowly reflected.

== Distribution ==
This species occurs in China; type locality: Wuchang, Hubei.
