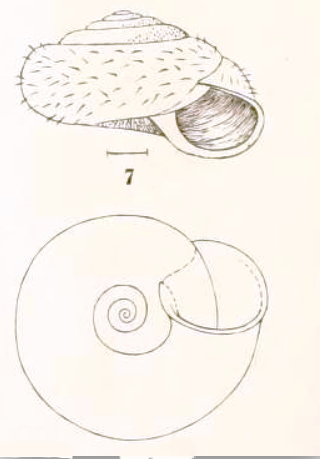
- Shell of Aegista lasia (holotype)

Scientific classification
- Kingdom: Animalia
- Phylum: Mollusca
- Class: Gastropoda
- Order: Stylommatophora
- Family: Camaenidae
- Genus: Aegista
- Species: A. lasia

Binomial name
- Aegista lasia (Pilsbry & Y. Hirase, 1909)

Synonyms
- Eulota (Aegista) lasia Pilsbry & Y. Hirase, 1909 (original combination)

= Aegista lasia =

Species of gastropod

Aegista lasia is a species of air-breathing land snails, a terrestrial pulmonate gastropod in the family Camaenidae.

== Description ==
The diameter of the shell attains 5.5 mm, its height 2.25 mm.

The shell is diminutive and depressed with its form openly umbilicate. It is delicately thin, and has a light brown color. Its surface is slightly shining and is covered with sporadic, elongated and curved hairs, most densely around its outer rim, yet sparse upon the inner whorls. The spire is composed of five quite convex whorls, each gently increasing and distinctly demarcated by a profound suture. The body whorl, gracefully rounded at its edge, dips slightly forward. Its aperture, rounded and crescent-like, inclines notably and is quite oblique. The peristome, delicately thin, widens narrowly, and is slightly reflexed at its base. The margins converge, joined by a thin parietal callus, encircling roughly a fifth of the circumference of the aperture.

== Distribution ==
This shell occurs in Korea.
