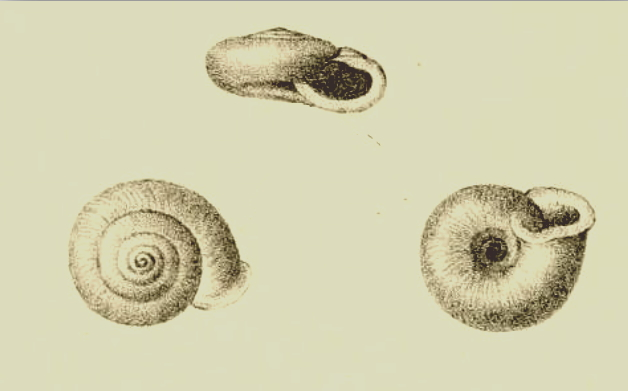
- Shell of Aegista megachila (holotype)

Scientific classification
- Kingdom: Animalia
- Phylum: Mollusca
- Class: Gastropoda
- Order: Stylommatophora
- Family: Camaenidae
- Genus: Aegista
- Species: A. megachila

Binomial name
- Aegista megachila Möllendorff, 1899

= Aegista megachila =

Species of gastropod

Aegista megachila is a species of air-breathing land snails, a terrestrial pulmonate gastropod in the family Camaenidae.

Subspecies

- Aegista megachila alticola Möllendorff, 1899

== Description ==
The diameter of the shell attains 17 mm, its height 7.5 mm.

== Distribution ==
This shell occurs in China.
