= Aegista hiroshifukudai =

Scientific classification
- Domain: Eukaryota
- Kingdom: Animalia
- Phylum: Mollusca
- Class: Gastropoda
- Order: Stylommatophora
- Family: Camaenidae
- Genus: Aegista
- Species: A. hiroshifukudai

Binomial name
- Aegista hiroshifukudai Hirano, Kameda & Chiba, 2016
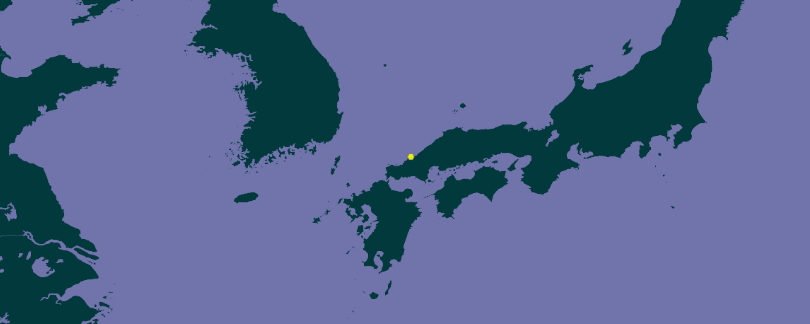

Species of gastropod

Aegista hiroshifukudai is a species of air-breathing land snails, a terrestrial pulmonate gastropod in the family Camaenidae.

== Distribution ==
This shell occurs in Honshu, Japan.
