= Aegista mitanensis =

Scientific classification
- Domain: Eukaryota
- Kingdom: Animalia
- Phylum: Mollusca
- Class: Gastropoda
- Order: Stylommatophora
- Family: Camaenidae
- Subfamily: Bradybaeninae
- Tribe: Aegistini
- Genus: Aegista
- Species: A. mitanensis

Binomial name
- Aegista mitanensis (Godwin-Austen, 1889)

Synonyms
- Aegista (Aegista) mitanensis Godwin-Austen, 1889 (no subgenera are recognized); Helix (Aegista) mitanensis Godwin-Austen, 1889

Species of gastropod

Aegista mitanensis is a species of air-breathing land snails, a terrestrial pulmonate gastropod in the family Camaenidae.

== Description ==
The diameter of the shell varies between 6.65 mm and 8.35 mm.

The thin, small shell is globosely conical and openly perforate. It is greenish brown. It is finely sculptured by close oblique striae and faint spiral markings above and below. The spire is conoid. The shell contains six convex whorls that are narrowly coiled. The body whorl is subangulate at the periphery, rounded below, dilated and descending in front. The aperture is subcircular. The peristome is thin. The upper margin is sinuate. The columellar margin is oblique and reflected above.

== Distribution ==
This species occurs in Myanmar and India.
