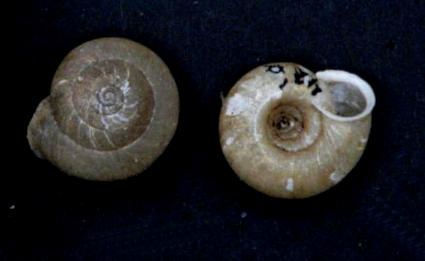
- Shell of Aegista friedeliana (specimen at Naturalis Biodiversity Center)

Scientific classification
- Kingdom: Animalia
- Phylum: Mollusca
- Class: Gastropoda
- Order: Stylommatophora
- Family: Camaenidae
- Genus: Aegista
- Species: A. friedeliana

Binomial name
- Aegista friedeliana (E. von Martens, 1864)

Subspecies
- A. f. aperta (Pilsbry, 1900); A. f. friedeliana (E. von Martens, 1864); A. f. humerosa (Pilsbry & Y. Hirase, 1904); A. f. perangulata (Pilsbry & Y. Hirase, 1909); A. f. peraperata (Pilsbry & Y. Hirase, 1903); A. f. vestita (Pilsbry & Y. Hirase, 1904)
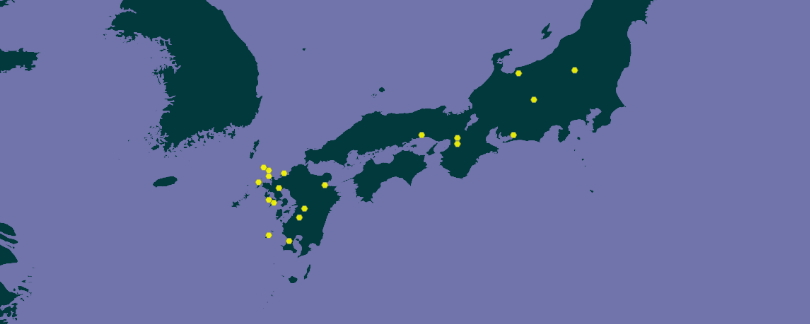

Synonyms
- Aegista (Aegista) friedeliana (E. von Martens, 1864) (no subgenera are recognized); Eulota (Aegista) friedeliana (E. von Martens, 1864) (unaccepted combination); Helix friedeliana E. von Martens, 1864 superseded combination

= Aegista friedeliana =

Species of gastropod

Aegista friedeliana is a species of air-breathing land snails, a terrestrial pulmonate gastropod in the family Camaenidae.

== Description ==
The diameter of the shell attains 19 mm.

The shell displays a broad umbilicus. It is delicately marked with slight oblique striae. The shell is tinted in an olive-brown hue. Its whorls exhibit a subtle convexity. The body whorl bears a gentle angularity, curving downward at the front and flattening convexly at the base. The white peristome is slightly thickened and gracefully expanded, with its margins drawing near.

== Distribution ==
This species occurs in Japan and Korea.
