= List of non-marine molluscs of South Korea =

Location of South Korea

The non-marine molluscs of South Korea are a part of the molluscan fauna of South Korea (wildlife of South Korea, environment of South Korea).

A number of species of non-marine molluscs are found in the wild in South Korea. For example, there are 87 non-marine molluscs on Jeju Island

== Freshwater gastropods ==
Semisulcospiridae

- Semisulcospira libertina (Gould, 1859)

Lymnaeidae

- Austropeplea ollula (Gould, 1859)
- Galba truncatula (O. F. Müller, 1774)
- Radix auricularia (Linnaeus, 1758)

Physidae

- Physella acuta (Draparnaud, 1805)

Planorbidae

- Gyraulus convexiusculus Hutton, 1849
- Polypylis hemisphaerula (Benson, 1842)
- Hippeutis cantori (Benson, 1850)

== Land gastropods ==
Land gastropods in South Korea include:

Hydrocenidae

- Georissa japonica Pilsbry, 1900

Cyclophoridae

- Cyclophorus herklotsi von Martens, 1861
- Platyraphe minutus quelpartensis (Pilsbry & Hirase, 1908)
- Cyclotus campanulatus von Martens, 1865
- Nakadaella micron (Pilsbry, 1900)
- Spirostoma japonicum japonicum (A. Adams, 1867)
- Chamalycaeus kurodai (Pilsbry & Hirase, 1908)
- Chamalycaeus hirasei (Pilsbry, 1900)
- Chamalycaeus cyclophoroides (Pilsbry & Hirase, 1909)
- Nobuea elegantistriata Kuroda & Miyanaga, 1943
- Nobuea sp. of Kimura & Noseworthy (2020)

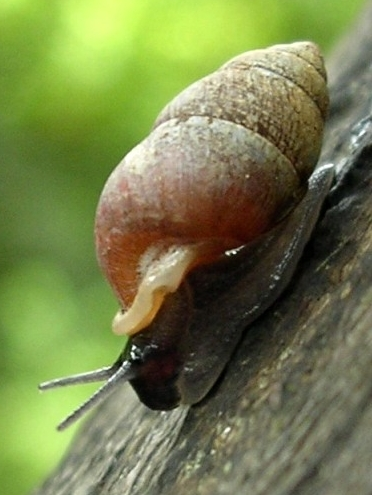
Pupinella rufa

Pupinidae

- Pupinella rufa (Sowerby, 1864)

Diplommatinidae

- Arinia chejuensis Kwon & Lee, 1991
- Palaina pusilla (von Martens, 1877)
- Diplommatina paxillus (Gredler, 1881)
- Diplommatina changensis (Kwon & Lee, 1991)
- Diplommatina chejuensis (Kwon & Lee, 1991)
- Diplommatina tyosenica Kuroda & Miyanaga, 1939
- Diplommatina kyobuntoensis Kuroda & Miyanaga, 1943

Assimineidae

- Paludinellassiminea japonica (Pilsbry, 1901)
- Paludinellassiminea stricta (Gould, 1859)
- Paludinellassiminea tanegashimae (Pilsbry, 1924)

Ellobiidae

- Allochroa layardi (H. Adams & A. Adams, 1855)
- Ellobium chinense (Pfeiffer, 1864)
- Laemodonta monilifera (H. Adams & A. Adams, 1854)
- Laemodonta exaratoides Kawabe, 1992
- Laemodonta octanfracta (Jonas, 1845)
- Laemodonta siamensis (Morelet, 1875)
- Microtralia acteocinoides Kuroda & Habe in Habe, 1961
- Melampus nuxcastaneus Kuroda, 1949
- Melampus fasciatus (Deshayes, 1830)
- Melampus taeniolus Hombron & Jaquinot, 1854

Carychiidae

- Carychium noduliferum Reinhardt, 1877
- Carychium pessimum Pilsbry, 1902
- Koreozospeum nodongense Lee, Prozorova & Jochum, 2015

Rathouisiidae

- Rathouisiidae sp. of Kimura et al. (2020)

Subulinidae

- Allopeas clavulinum (Potiez & Michaud, 1838)
  - Allopeas clavulinum pyrgula (Schmacker & Boettger, 1891)
  - Allopeas clavulinum kyotense (Pilsbry & Hirase, 1904)

Diapheridae

- Sinoennea iwakawa (Pilsbry, 1900)
- Sinoennea cave (Pilsbry & Hirase, 1908)

Succineidae

- Oxyloma hirasei (Pilsbry, 1901)
- Novisuccinea lyrata (A. A. Gould, 1859) = suspected synonym Neosuccinea horticola koreana Pilsbry, 1926

Cochlicopidae

- Cochlicopa lubrica (Müller, 1774)

Gastrocoptidae

- Gastrocopta armigerella (Reinhardt, 1877)
- Gastrocopta coreana (Pilsbry, 1916)
- Gastrocopta jinjiroi Kuroda & Hukuda, 1944

Vertiginidae

- Vertigo japonica coreana Pilsbry, 1919
- Vertigo alpestris uturyotoensis Kuroda & Hukuda, 1944

Pupillidae

- Pupilla cryptodon (Heude, 1880)

Pyramidulidae

- Pyramidula micra Pilsbry, 1926
- Pyramidula kobayashii Kuroda & Hukuda, 1944

Valloniidae

- Vallonia costata (O. F. Müller, 1774)
- Zoogenetes harpa (Say, 1824)
- Zoogenetes tyosenica Kuroda & Hukuda, 1944

Strobilopsidae

- Eostrobilops hirasei (Pilsbry, 1908)
- Eostrobilops coreana (Pilsbry, 1926–1927)

Truncatellinidae

- Columella edentula (Draparnaud, 1805)

Enidae

- Ena coreanica Pilsbry & Hirase, 1908
- Mirus junensis Kwon & Lee, 1991

Clausiliidae

- Euphaedusa fusaniana (Pilsbry & Hirase, 1908)
  - Euphaedusa fusaniana uturyotoensis Kuroda & Hukuda, 1944
- Euphaedusa aculus
  - Euphaedusa aculus coreana (Möllendorff, 1887)
  - Euphaedusa aculus mokpoensis (Pilsbry & Hirase, 1908)
- Euphaedusa gottschei (Möllendorff, 1887)
- Euphaedusa hukudai (Kuroda & Miyanaga, 1943)
- Reinia variegata (Adams, 1868)
- Reinia sieboldtii insularis (Kuroda & Hukuda, 1944)
- Zaptyx miyanagai (Kuroda, 1936)
  - Zaptyx miyanagai ullundoensis (Kwon & Lee, 1991)
- Paganizaptyx miyanagai guryongsan Choi & Park, 2020

Helicarionidae

- Otesiopsis sp. of Kimura et al. (2019)

Chronidae

- Parakaliella serica
- Trochochlamys crenulata (Gude, 1900)
- Gastrodontella stenogyra (A. Adams, 1868)
- Yamatochlamys lampra (Pilsbry & Hirase, 1904)
- Bekkochlamys subrejecta (Pilsbry & Hirase in Hirase, 1908)
- Bekkochlamys quelpartensis (Pilsbry & Hirase, 1908)
- Nipponochlamys fusanus (Hirase, 1908)
- Nipponochlamys hypostilbe (Pilsbry & Hirase, 1909)

Euconulidae

- Coneuplecta circumcincta (Reinhardt, 1883)
- Coneuplecta japonica (Kuroda & Miyanaga, 1943)
- Coneuplecta chejuensis (Kwon & Lee, 1991)
- Parasitala miyanagai (Kuroda & Hukuda, 1944)
- Discoconulus sinapidium (Reinhardt, 1877)

Limacidae

- Limax flavus Linnaeus, 1758
- Lehmannia marginata (O. F. Müller, 1774)

Agriolimacidae

- Deroceras reticulatum (Müller, 1774)
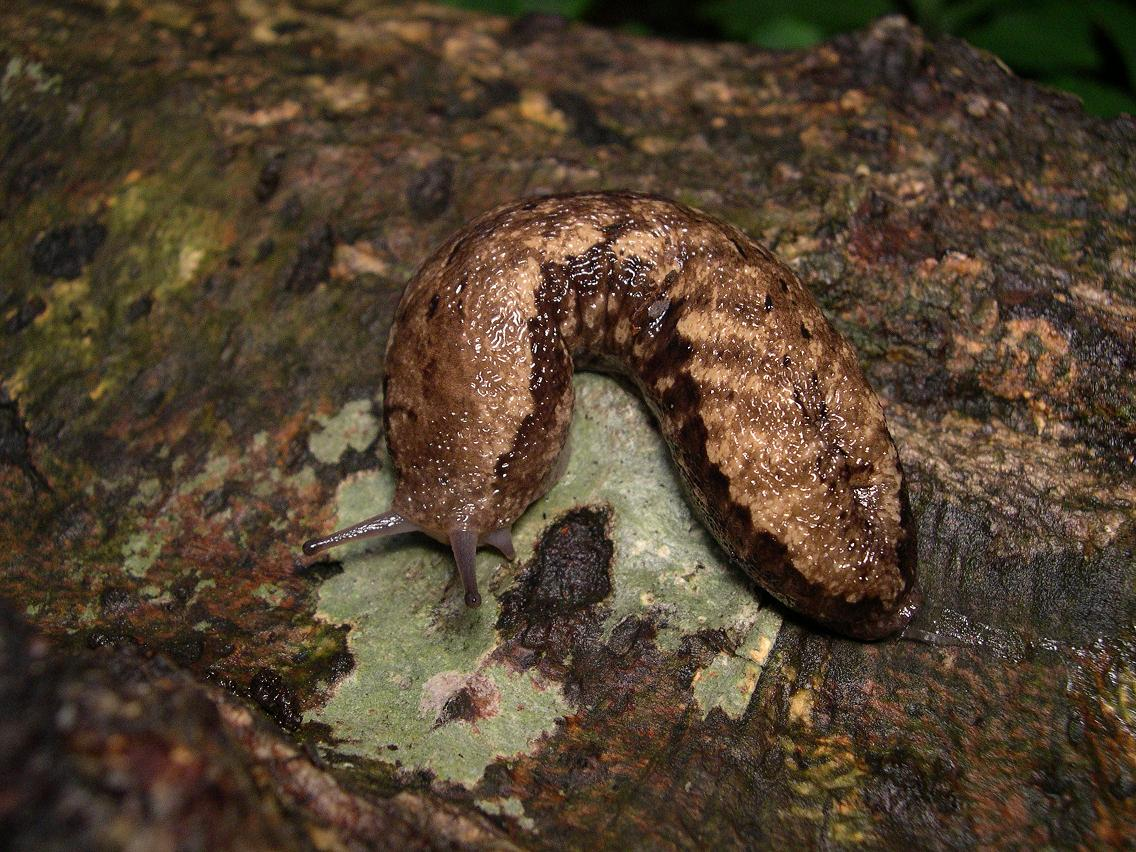
  Meghimatium fruhstorferi

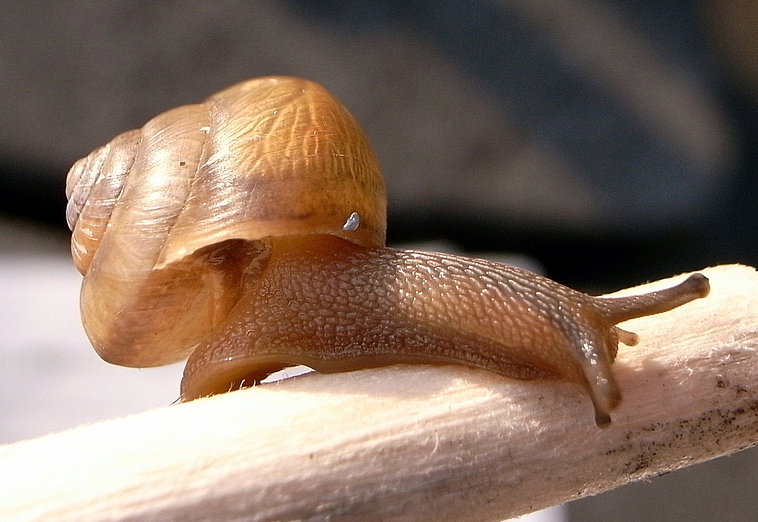
Acusta despecta sieboldiana

Philomycidae

- Meghimatium bilineatum (Benson, 1842)
- Meghimatium fruhstorferi (Collinge, 1901)
- Meghimatium hongdoensis G.-M. Park, 2021
- Meghimatium uniforme (Laidlaw 1937)

Camaenidae

- Aegista
  - Aegista chejuensis (Pilsbry & Hirase, 1908)
  - Aegista chosenica (Pilsbry, 1906)
  - Aegista diversa Kuroda & Miyanaga, 1936
  - Aegista gottschei (Möllendorff, 1887)
    - Aegista gottschei fusanica (Pilsbry, 1926)
    - Aegista gottschei kyobuntonis (Kuroda & Miyanaga, 1943)
  - Aegista lasia Pilsbry & Hirase, 1909
  - Acusta sieboldiana (Pfeiffer, 1850)
  - Aegista oculus (L. Pfeiffer, 1850)
  - Aegista proxima (Pilsbry & Hirase, 1909)
  - Aegista pyramidata (Pilsbry, 1926)
  - Aegista quelpartensis (Pilsbry & Hirase, 1904)
  - Aegista tenuissima (Pilsbry & Hirase, 1908)
- Bradybaena
  - Bradybaena sanboensis (Kuroda & Miyanaga, 1939)
    - Bradybaena sanboensis montana (Kuroda & Miyanaga, 1943)
  - Bradybaena hukudai
- Trishoplita
  - Trishoplita pumilio (Pilsbry & Hirase, 1909)
- Lepidopisum
  - Lepidopisum verrucosum (Reinhardt, 1877)
- Karaftohelix
  - Karaftohelix kurodana (Pilsbry, 1926)
  - Karaftohelix koreana (Pfeiffer, 1850)
  - Karaftohelix adamsi (Kuroda & Hukuda, 1944)
  - Karaftohelix gainesi (Pilsbry, 1900) superseded combination Ezohelix gainesi (Pilsbry, 1900)
- Satsuma
  - Satsuma myomphala (Martens, 1865)
- Euhadra
  - Euhadra herklotsi (von Martens, 1860)
  - Euhadra dixoni (Pilsbry, 1900)
- Nesiohelix
  - Nesiohelix samarangae Kuroda & Miyanaga, 1943
  - Nesiohelix swinhoei Pfeiffer, 1865
- Plectotropis
  - Plectotropis mackensii (A. Adams & Reeve, 1850)
  - Plectotropis aemula (Gude, 1900)
- Pseudobuliminus muleung Choi & Park, 2020

== Freshwater bivalves ==
Unionidae Rafinesque, 1820

- Cristaria plicata (Leach, 1814)
- Anemina arcaeformis (Heude, 1877)

== See also ==
Lists of molluscs of surrounding countries:

- List of non-marine molluscs of North Korea, Wildlife of North Korea
- List of non-marine molluscs of China
- List of non-marine molluscs of Japan
