= Wildlife of Korea =

Flora and fauna of Korea

The wildlife of Korea belongs to the Palearctic realm. Native or endemic species of the Korean Peninsula include Korean hare, Korean water deer, Korean field mouse, Korean brown frog, Korean pine and Korean spruce. The Korean Demilitarized Zone (DMZ) with its forest and natural wetlands is a unique biodiversity spot, which harbours 82 endangered species such as the red-crowned crane, Amur leopard and the Siberian tiger. Overall, DMZ is home to about 70 mammalian species, more than 300 birds and about 3,000 plants.

At the same time, the populations of Ussuri brown bears, Siberian lynxes, Siberian tigers, Mongolian wolves, Ussuri dholes and Amur leopards, which once inhabited the Korean Peninsula, are presently very rare or extirpated, and likewise large ungulates (with the exceptions of roe deer, water deer and wild boar) are uncommon. The local wildlife sustained major damage during the Japanese occupation in 1910–1945 and subsequent Korean War, particularly due to overhunting of tigers.

== By region ==
Divided by the DMZ, wildlife of Korean peninsula can be further divided into wildlife of North Korea and wildlife of South Korea.

== Fauna ==
The white heron has long been a symbol of local nature imagery and poetry. The Korean Peninsula accommodates 515 reported species of birds, which, as of 2011, was about 4% of the world total. Plains are inhabited by migratory waterfowl and cranes. The open countryside is inhabited by the common pheasant. South Korean wetlands support over one million wintering ducks and geese.

Carnivorans include weasels, badgers and marten. The northern part of the Korean Peninsula is home to antelopes and raccoon dogs.

Aquatic fauna includes about 212 species of freshwater fish. Four species of them received the status of Natural Monument Fish – marbled eel, spotted barbel, Manchurian trout and golden mandarin fish. The Korean Peninsula has a significant number of native freshwater fish species, which includes Korean taimen, Korean stumpy bullhead, Korean spotted hopper, south torrent catfish and black shiner. Endemic marine fauna includes Korean skate and Korean rockfish.

Korea's aquatic invertebrate biodiversity needs to be studied extensively. Some groups of the water fleas are cryptic species or species flocks.

The number of insects in the Korean Peninsula is estimated at about 12,300 species.

== Flora ==
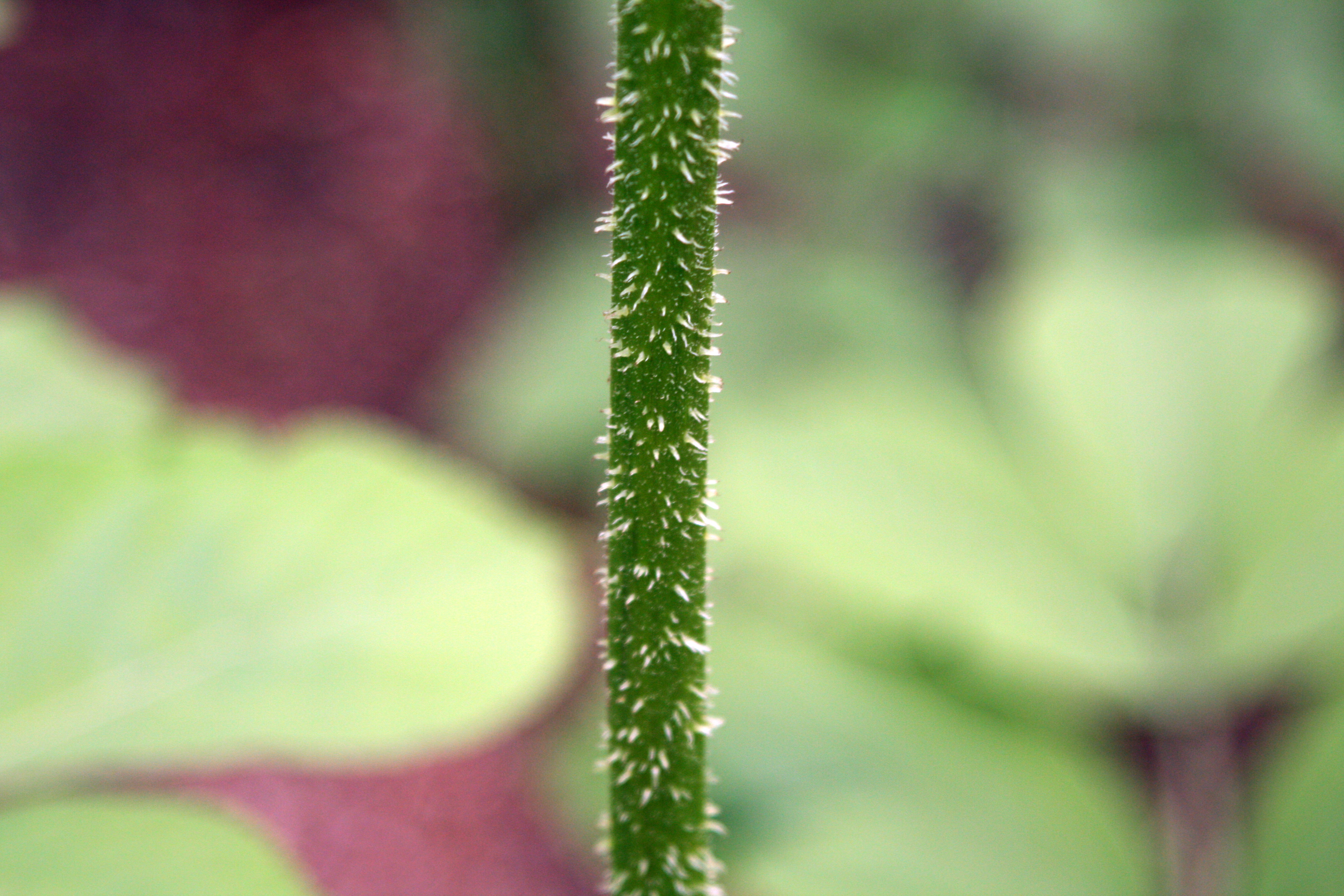
Aralia cordata var. continentalis

The Korean Peninsula is home to about 3,034 species of vascular plants, which belong to 217 families, 1,045 genera and 406 infraspecific taxa. Korean forests include evergreen pines and deciduous trees – maple, birch, poplar, oak, ash and elm. Common fruit trees include apple, pear, peach, apricot, plum, persimmon and Chinese quince. High mountains feature exclusively alpine plants. Southern coastal areas harbour citrus plants. Several hundreds plant species are considered medicinal. Hibiscus syriacus is the national flower of South Korea.

The flora of North Korea has over 100 endemic species of vascular plants.

== Preservation ==
A member of the Convention on Biological Diversity since 1994, South Korea has 298 protected areas, of which 289 are IUCN-categorized. The country joined IUCN in 2006. Hallasan National Park was designated by UNESCO as a Biosphere Reserve in 2002, a World Natural Heritage in 2007, and a Global Geopark in 2010, making the associated Jeju Island the only place on Earth to receive all three UNESCO designations in the field of natural sciences. In 1963 Korea Association for the Conservation of Nature was established. In 1997 the non-profit organization International Aid for Korean Animals was founded to promote animal protection and humane treatment. Animal Rescue Korea, an English-language internet resource, helps animals in South Korea.

North Korea adopted a Ten Year Plan for Afforestation/Reforestation to revive two million hectares of degraded forests.

== See also ==
- List of mammals of Korea
- List of birds of Korea
- List of amphibians of Korea
- List of reptiles of Korea
- List of freshwater fishes of Korea
- List of non-marine molluscs of South Korea
