= List of non-marine molluscs of North Korea =

Location of North Korea

The non-marine molluscs of North Korea are a part of the molluscan fauna of North Korea (wildlife of North Korea, environment of North Korea).

The species documented in this article are primarily based on the National Species List of Korea: Invertebrates of North Korea (excluding insects) published by the Ministry of Environment (South Korea).

== Freshwater gastropods ==
Viviparidae

- Cipangopaludina cathayensis (Heude, 1890)
- Cipangopaludina chinensis (Gray in Griffith & Pidgeon, 1834)
  - Cipangopaludina chinensis malleata (Reeve, 1863)
- Cipangopaludina ussuriensis (Gerstfeldt, 1859)
- Sinotaia aeruginosa (Reeve, 1863)
- Viviparus chui Yen, 1937

Assimineidae

- Assiminea japonica Martens, 1877

Bithyniidae

- Parafossarulus manchouricus (Bourguignat, 1860)
- Bithynia chinensis Hude
- Bithynia ussuriensis

Stenothyridae

- Stenothyra glabra A. Adams, 1861
- Stenothyra recondita Lindholm, 1929

Pleuroceridae

- Koreanomelania nodifila (v. Martens, 1886)
- Semisulcospira coreana (v. Martens, 1886)
- Semisulcospira gottschei (v. Martens, 1886)
- Semisulcospira libertina (Gould, 1859)
- Semisulcospira tegulata (v. Martens, 1894)

Valvatidae

- Valvata brevicula Kozhov, 1936

Lymnaeidae

- Austropeplea ollula (Gould, 1859)
- Galba truncatula (Müller, 1774)
- Lymnaea palustris ovata (Draparnaud, 1805)
- Lymnaea peregra (O. F. Müller, 1774)
- Lymnaea stagnalis (Linnaeus, 1758)
- Lymnaea swinhoei H. Adams, 1866
- Radix auricularia (Linnaeus, 1758)
- Radix lagotis (Schrank, 1803)
- Radix latispira (Yen)
- Radix plicatula (Benson, 1842)

Physidae

- Aplexa hypnorum (Linnaeus, 1758)
- Physa acuta (Draparnaud, 1805)
- Physa fontinalis (Linnaeus, 1758)

Planorbidae

- Gyraulus convexiusculus (Hutton, 1849)
- Gyraulus gredleri (Gledler, 1859)
- Gyraulus illibatus (Westerlund, 1883)
- Hippeutis cantori (Benson, 1850)
- Planorbis carinatus
- Planorbis corneus
- Polypylis hemisphaerula (Benson, 1842)
- Polypylis nitida

== Land gastropods ==
Succineidae

- Neosuccinea horticola koreana (Pilsbry, 1926)
- Oxyloma hirasei (Pilsbry, 1901)
- Succinea evoluta Martens, 1879
- Succinea indica

Ariophantidae

- Microcystis perdita

Cochlicopidae

- Cochlicopa lubrica (Müller, 1774)

Pupillidae

- Gibbulinopsis cryptodon (Heude, 1880)
- Pupilla aeoli
- Pupilla cupa
- Pupilla muscorum

Valloniidae

- Vallonia costata (Müller, 1774)
- Vallonia patens (Reinhardt, 1883)
- Vallonia pulchella (Müller, 1774)

Vertiginidae

- Gastrocopta armigerella (Reinhardt, 1877)

Subulinidae

- Allopeas clavulinum pyrgula (Schmacker & Böttger, 1891)

Philomycidae

- Meghimatium bilineatum (Benson, 1842)
- Megtiumhima fruhstorferi (Collinge, 1901)

Gastrodontidae

- Zonitoides nitidus (O. F. Müller, 1774)

Helicarionidae

- Kaliella minuta
- Macrochlamys sinensis
- Parasitala nanodes (Gude, 1900)
- Trochochlamys crenulata (Gude, 1900)
- Trochochlamys fraterna H. A. Pilsbry, 1900

Bradybaenidae

- Aegista aemula (Gude, 1900)
- Bradybaena kiangsiensis
- Bradybaena maacki

Bradybaenidae

- Bradybaena maacki
- Bradybaena ravida ravida (Benson, 1842)
- Bradybaena similaris (Férussac, 1822)
- Fruticicola lubuaba (Sow.)
- Ganesella arcasiana
- Virginihelix virgo (Pilsbry, 1926)

Limacidae

- Agriolimax agrestis
- Agriolimax pellucidus
- Limax flavus Linnaeus, 1758

Chronidae

- Pseudhelicarion micrograpta (Pilsbry, 1900)

Discidae

- Discus pauper (Gould, 1859)

== Freshwater bivalves ==
Mytilidae

- Limnoperna fortunei (Dunker, 1857)

Pteriidae

- Margaritana dahurica

Unionidae

- Anemia euscaphys Heude, 1879
- Lamprotula bazini (Heude, 1877)
- Lamprotula coreana (Martens, 1905)
- Lamprotula leai (Griffith & Pidgeon, 1834)

Cyrenidae

- Corbicula fluminea Müller, 1774
- Corbicula lianeprime
- Corbicula sandai Reinhardt, 1878

Sphaeriidae

- Musculium compressum Mousson, 1887
- Musculium lacustre (Müller, 1774)

== See also ==
Lists of molluscs of surrounding countries:

- List of non-marine molluscs of South Korea, Wildlife of South Korea
- List of non-marine molluscs of China
- List of non-marine molluscs of Japan
