= Chejuensis =

Chejuensis may refer to:

- Aegista chejuensis, species of land snails
- Hahella chejuensis, species of bacteria
