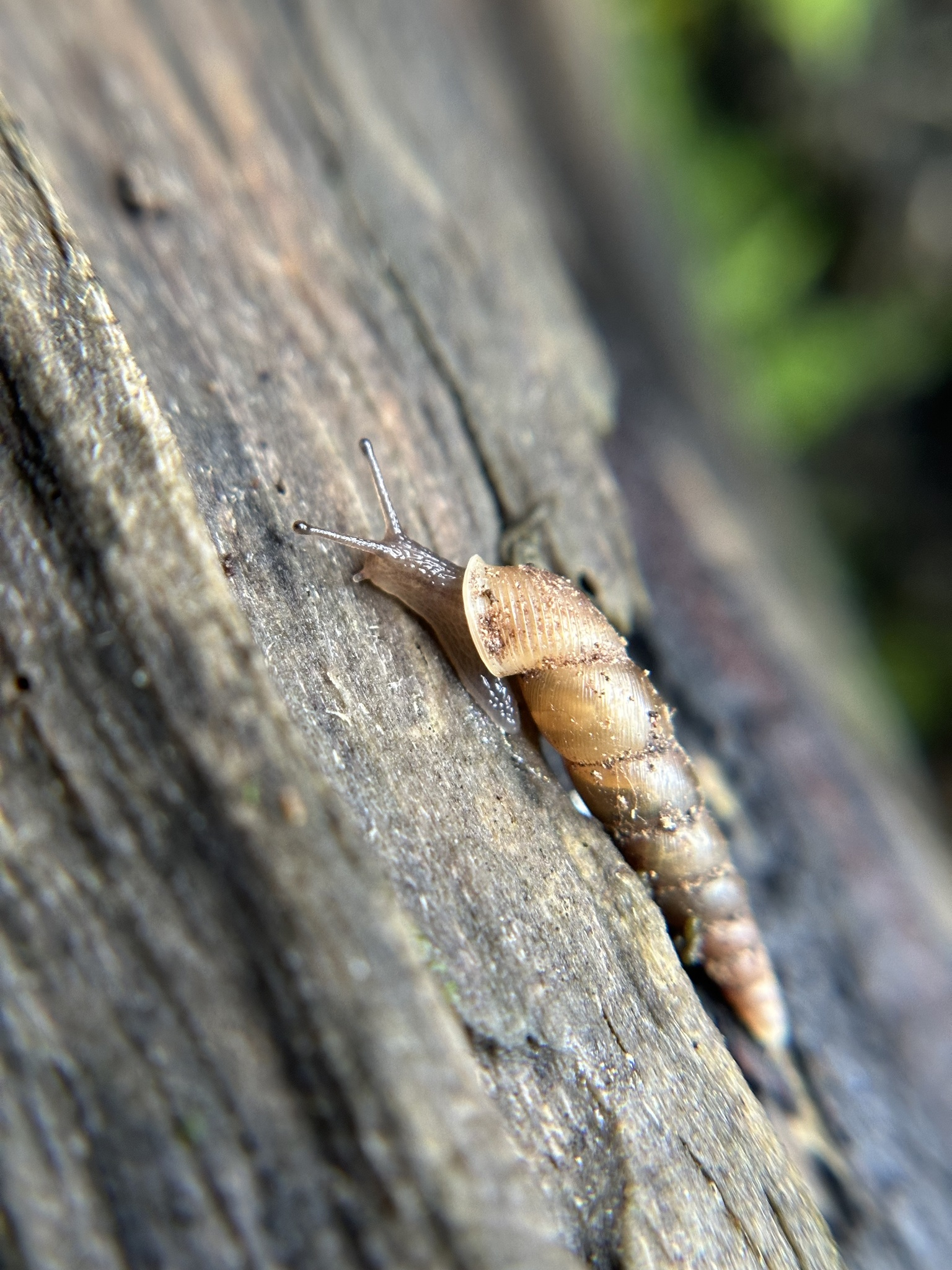
- Tauphaedusa tau

Scientific classification
- Kingdom: Animalia
- Phylum: Mollusca
- Class: Gastropoda
- Order: Stylommatophora
- Family: Clausiliidae
- Tribe: Phaedusini
- Genus: Tauphaedusa; H. Nordsieck, 2003

Type species
- Clausilia tau O. Boettger, 1877

Synonyms
- Euphaedusa (Tauphaedusa) H. Nordsieck, 2003 ·

= Tauphaedusa =

Genus of gastropods

Tauphaedusa is a genus of land snails belonging to the subfamily Phaedusinae of the family Clausiliidae. The type species is Tauphaedusa tau (O. Boettger, 1877).

The genus was first described in 2003 by the German malacologist, Hartmut Nordsieck, who described it as a subgenus of Euphaedusa, stating that "this subgenus is identical with the tau group from mainland China ...and includes all Euphaedusa species from Taiwan, South Korea and the Japanese Islands, except E. aculus".

In a 2021 paper, Sulikowska-Drozd, Hwang, Páll-Gergely and Wu suggested elevating this subgenus to the rank of genus.

== Species ==
- Tauphaedusa broderseni (O. Boettger & Schmacker, 1894)
- Tauphaedusa claviformis (L. Pfeiffer, 1850)
- Tauphaedusa comes (Pilsbry, 1900)
- Tauphaedusa digonoptyx (O. Boettger, 1877)
- Tauphaedusa eumegetha (Schmacker & O. Boettger, 1891)
- Tauphaedusa fusaniana (Pilsbry & Y. Hirase, 1908)
- Tauphaedusa gemina (Gredler, 1881)
- Tauphaedusa gottschei (Möllendorff, 1887)
- Tauphaedusa ponsonbyi (O. Boettger, 1883)
- Tauphaedusa rowlandi (Pilsbry, 1902)
- Tauphaedusa senkakuensis (Kuroda, 1960)
- Tauphaedusa sheridani (L. Pfeiffer, 1866)
- Tauphaedusa stearnsii (Pilsbry, 1895)
- Tauphaedusa subaculus (Pilsbry, 1902)
- Tauphaedusa tau (O. Boettger, 1877)
