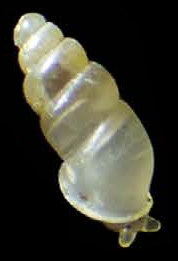
- A live Carychium pessimum

Scientific classification
- Kingdom: Animalia
- Phylum: Mollusca
- Class: Gastropoda
- Order: Ellobiida
- Family: Ellobiidae
- Genus: Carychium
- Species: C. pessimum

Binomial name
- Carychium pessimum Pilsbry, 1902

= Carychium pessimum =

Species of gastropod

Carychium pessimum is a species of small air-breathing land snail, a terrestrial pulmonate gastropod mollusk in the family Ellobiidae.

== Distribution ==
South Korea
