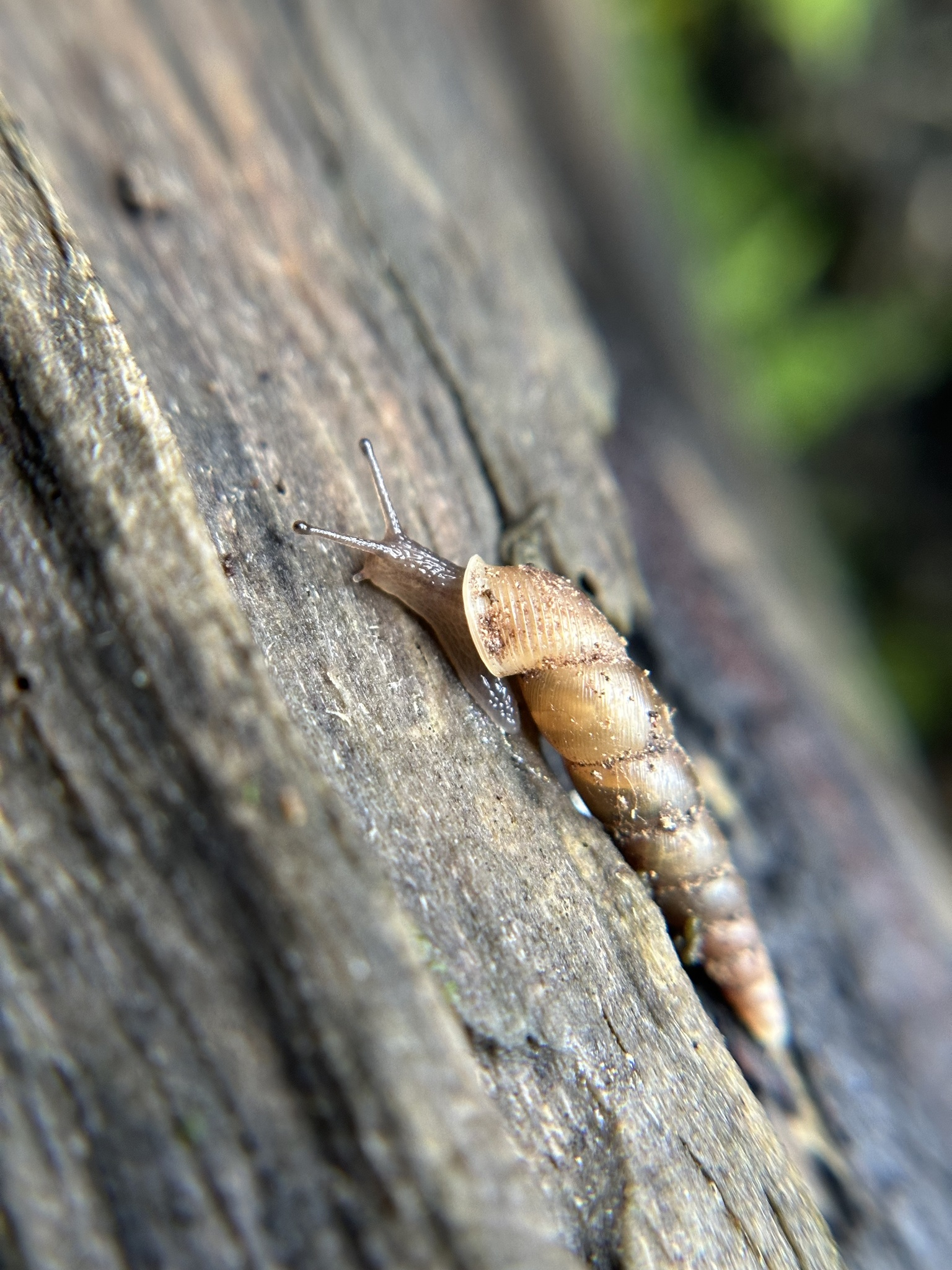
- Tauphaedusa tau

Scientific classification
- Kingdom: Animalia
- Phylum: Mollusca
- Class: Gastropoda
- Order: Stylommatophora
- Family: Clausiliidae
- Tribe: Phaedusini
- Genus: Tauphaedusa
- Species: T. tau

Binomial name
- Tauphaedusa tau (O. Boettger, 1877)

Synonyms
- Clausilia tau O. Boettger, 1877; Clausilia flavescens Heude, 1884; Clausilia missionis Ancey, 1883; Clausilia rathouisiana Heude, 1882; Clausilia straminea Heude, 1882; Clausilia tau O. Boettger, 1877; Clausilia tau var. cyclostoma Möllendorff, 1883; Euphaedusa (Tauphaedusa) tau (O. Boettger, 1877); Euphaedusa hunanensis cyclostoma (Möllendorff, 1883); Euphaedusa rathouisiana (Heude, 1882); Phaedusa sanmenensis T.-C. Luo, D.-N. Chen & G.-Q. Zhang, 1998

= Tauphaedusa tau =

Species of land snail

Tauphaedusa tau is a species of land snail belonging to the subfamily Phaedusinae of the family Clausiliidae. The species was first described in 1877 by Oskar Boettger as Clausilia tau.

It is viviparous.

It is found in Japan, China and Taiwan.

In Japan, these snails are known to host Riccardoella mites in their lungs, and they also host trematodes of the family, Dicrocoeliidae. In Hawaii, they have been found to host Angiostrongylus cantonensis, a parasite which if transferred to humans can lead to eosinophilic meningitis, causing neurological damage, and possibly death.

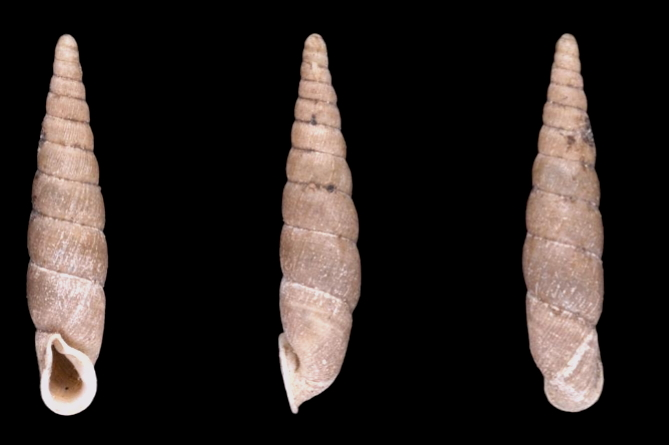
Specimens of Tauphaedusa tau at the USNM, Smithsonian Institution
