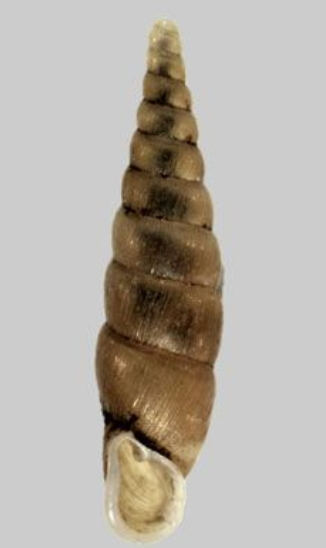
- Shell of Tauphaedusa fusaniana (specimen at the Natural History Museum, Rotterdam)

Scientific classification
- Kingdom: Animalia
- Phylum: Mollusca
- Class: Gastropoda
- Order: Stylommatophora
- Family: Clausiliidae
- Genus: Tauphaedusa
- Species: T. fusaniana

Binomial name
- Tauphaedusa fusaniana (Pilsbry & Y. Hirase, 1908)

Subspecies
- Tauphaedusa fusaniana fusaniana (Pilsbry & Y. Hirase, 1908); Tauphaedusa fusaniana uturyotoensis (Kuroda & Hukuda, 1944)

Synonyms
- Clausilia (Euphaedusa) fusaniana Pilsbry & Y. Hirase, 1908 superseded combination (basionym); Euphaedusa (Tauphaedusa) fusaniana (Pilsbry & Y. Hirase, 1908) (unaccepted combination); Euphaedusa fusaniana (Pilsbry & Y. Hirase, 1908) (unaccepted combination)

= Tauphaedusa fusaniana =

Species of land snail

Tauphaedusa fusaniana, common name the Busan door snail, is a species of sinistral (left-coiling), air-breathing land snail in the family Clausiliidae.

The species comprises two recognized subspecies with distinct morphological and geographical differences. The nominate subspecies, Tauphaedusa fusaniana fusaniana, features 10 to 11 whorls and a distinct superior lamella, typically inhabiting somewhat dry shrubberies and rock piles across southern South Korea and its coastal islands. In contrast, Tauphaedusa fusaniana uturyotoensis is characterized by 10.5 whorls, a low and blunt superior lamella, and a long, distinct principal plica inside the shell. Furthermore, this subspecies is strictly endemic to Ulleungdo Island, where it resides in damp forest leaf litter and rock crevices.

== Description and biology ==
The shell reaches a length of 16 mm (0.63 in) and a diameter of 4 mm (0.16 in), with a total of 12 whorls.

The shell is slender and pupiform (club-shaped), typically ranging from yellowish-white to yellow. The apex is spherical and unangled, leading to a spire with deep sutures. It is a hermaphroditic and ovoviviparous species, undergoing direct development without a free-living larval stage.

Original description:

The shell is thin and brown in color, though it appears paler below the suture. Its surface is glossy and is distinctly and finely striate throughout, with the exception of the first three whorls. The striae are weaker on the penultimate whorl and perceptibly stronger on the last half of the body whorl. Frequently, however, the shell is more or less worn or corroded, at which point it becomes light gray and the sculpture becomes indistinct.

The shell consists of 11 to 12 strongly convex whorls. The first 2½ whorls form a cylinder that measures scarcely 1 millimeter in diameter, while the rest of the whorls increase slowly until reaching the penultimate whorl, which is the widest. The body whorl is distinctly flattened at the side and convex below. The aperture is small, comprising only one-fifth of the total length of the shell; it is ovate in shape and features a well-defined, slightly retracted sinulus (a specialized, U-shaped or circular notch located at the posterior (upper) end of the aperture). The peristome is thick or very thick, well reflexed, and free above, as it is carried forward a short distance from the preceding whorl.

The superior lamella is low and small, reaching the margin but remaining separated from the spiral lamella. This spiral lamella is rather high and extends inward to a point above the sinulus. The inferior lamella is very low and appears inconspicuous from the front, being formed in the same manner as in C. fax. The subcolumellar lamella usually emerges to the lip-edge, though in some individuals it hardly emerges at all.

There is a principal plica that is one-third of a whorl long and situated in a dorso-lateral position. The upper palatal plica measures one-third to one-half the length of the principal plica, while the lower palatal plica is a short, slightly oblique, and strong nodule. There is no lunella (a specialized, crescent-shaped internal calcareous ridge), although the wall may be paler in that position.

== Distribution ==
This species is endemic to the Korean Peninsula.
