= Polypylis =

Scientific classification
- Kingdom: Animalia
- Phylum: Mollusca
- Class: Gastropoda
- Superorder: Hygrophila
- Family: Planorbidae
- Subfamily: Planorbinae
- Tribe: Segmentinini
- Genus: Polypylis; Pilsbry, 1906

Genus of freshwater snails

Polypylis is a genus of gastropods belonging to the family Planorbidae.

The species of this genus are found in Southern and Southeastern Asia.

Species:

- Polypylis almaatina Starobogatov & Mamilova, 1970
- Polypylis calathus (Benson, 1850)
- Polypylis hemisphaerula (Benson, 1842)
- Polypylis likharevi Starobogatov & Streletzkaja, 1967
- Polypylis nitidella (von Martens, 1877)
- Polypylis semiglobosa Moskvicheva, 1980
- Polypylis sibirica Starobogatov & Streletzkaja, 1967
- Polypylis starobogatovi Izzatullaev, 1973
- Polypylis taia (Annandale & Rao, 1925)
- Polypylis usta
