= Tauphaedusa gottschei =

Scientific classification
- Kingdom: Animalia
- Phylum: Mollusca
- Class: Gastropoda
- Order: Stylommatophora
- Superfamily: Clausilioidea
- Family: Clausiliidae
- Tribe: Phaedusini
- Genus: Tauphaedusa
- Species: T. gottschei

Binomial name
- Tauphaedusa gottschei (Möllendorff, 1887)

Synonyms
- Clausilia gottschei Möllendorff, 1887 Clausilia (Euphaedusa) gottschei Möllendorff, 1887 Euphaedusa (Tauphaedusa) gottschei (Möllendorff, 1887) Euphaedusa gottschei (Möllendorff, 1887) Phaedusa (Euphaedusa) gottschei (Möllendorff, 1887)

Species of land snail

Tauphaedusa gottschei is a species of land snail belonging to the subfamily Phaedusinae of the family Clausiliidae.

The species was first described in 1877 by Otto Franz von Möllendorff as Clausilia (Euphaedusa) Gottschei. The species epithet honours Gottsche, who collected the type specimen in Korea.

== Distribution ==
It is found on the Korean Peninsula. and Japan.
