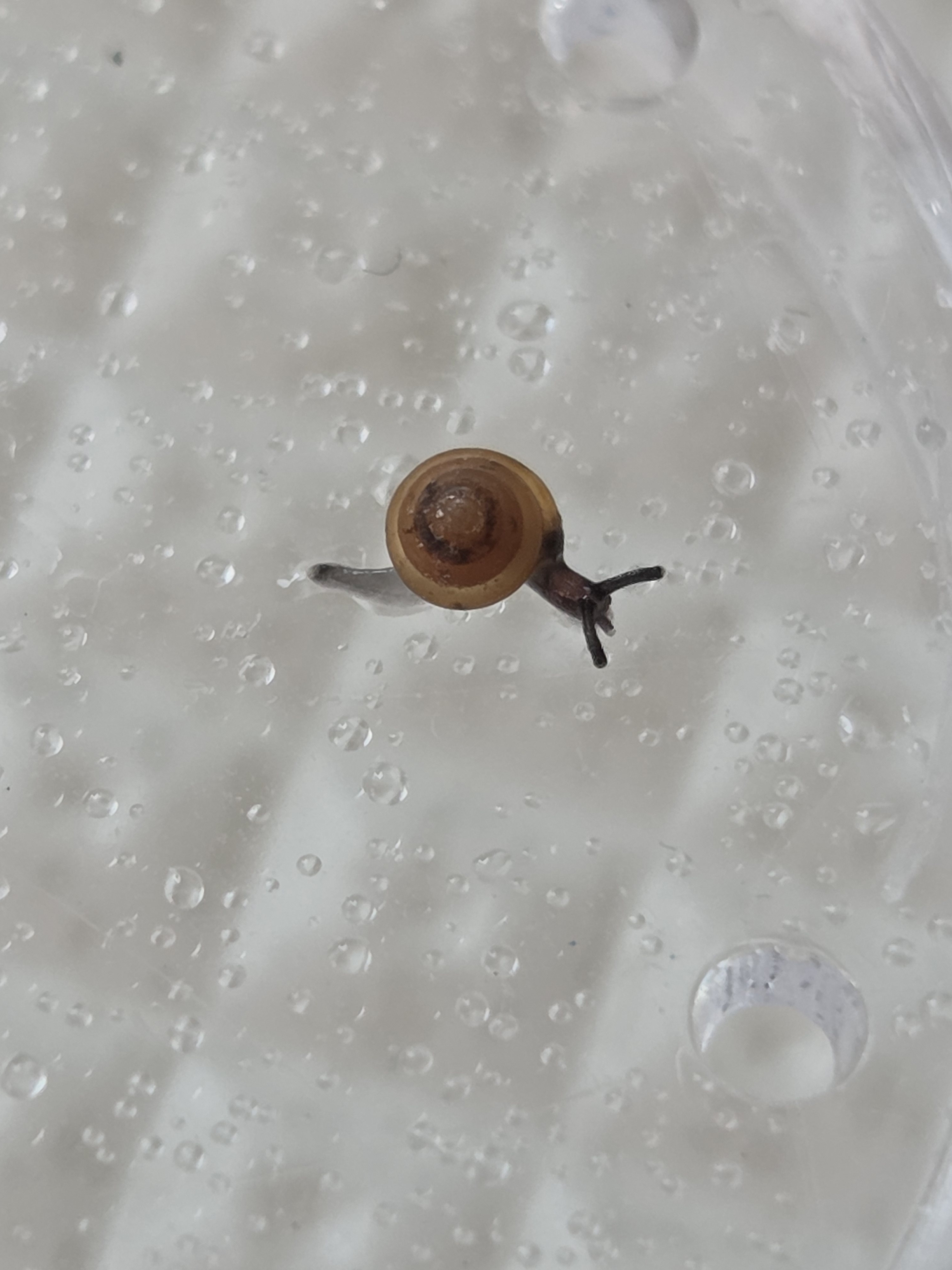
- Live Parakaliella serica

Scientific classification
- Kingdom: Animalia
- Phylum: Mollusca
- Class: Gastropoda
- Order: Stylommatophora
- Family: Chronidae
- Genus: Parakaliella
- Species: P. serica

Binomial name
- Parakaliella serica (Pilsbry, 1927)

Synonyms
- Kaliella serica Pilsbry, 1927

= Parakaliella serica =

Species of snail

Parakaliella serica is a terrestrial gastropod in the family Chronidae, with its type locality situated in Pyongyang, North Korea. It was first described as a new species by the American malacologist Henry Augustus Pilsbry, based on specimens from the Pyongyang area.

The specific epithet serica is derived from Latin, meaning "silken" or "silk-like." Although it was originally published under the genus Kaliella, the species was later reassigned to the genus Parakaliella following a taxonomic reclassification of East Asian helicarionids, which was prompted by distinct differences in the morphology of their reproductive organs.

== Description ==
Overall, it is a minute species of land snail. The shell is conical, widening progressively toward the base from a convex apex.

It consists of 6.5 whorls, featuring a relatively elevated spire. A distinguishing characteristic is the deep sutures between the slightly inflated whorls, which give the whorl profiles a distinct appearance.

The body is dark grayish-brown and possesses the long tail typical of the family Chronidae.

This species is hermaphroditic; fertilized eggs are laid in a single clutch, and development is direct, meaning they hatch as miniature versions of the adults without a larval stage.

Pilsbry noted that juveniles of this species exhibit a more depressed form than the adults.

== Habitat ==
According to the South Korean National Institute of Biological Resources (korean:국립생물자원관), this snail is endemic to Korea, with a distribution spanning various regions including Pyeongannam-do, Hwanghae-do, Gangwon-do, Chungcheongbuk-do, Gyeongsangnam-do, and Jeollanam-do. They are typically found beneath leaf litter in moist forests characterized by an abundance of low-lying shrubs, such as azaleas and forsythias.

== Gallery ==
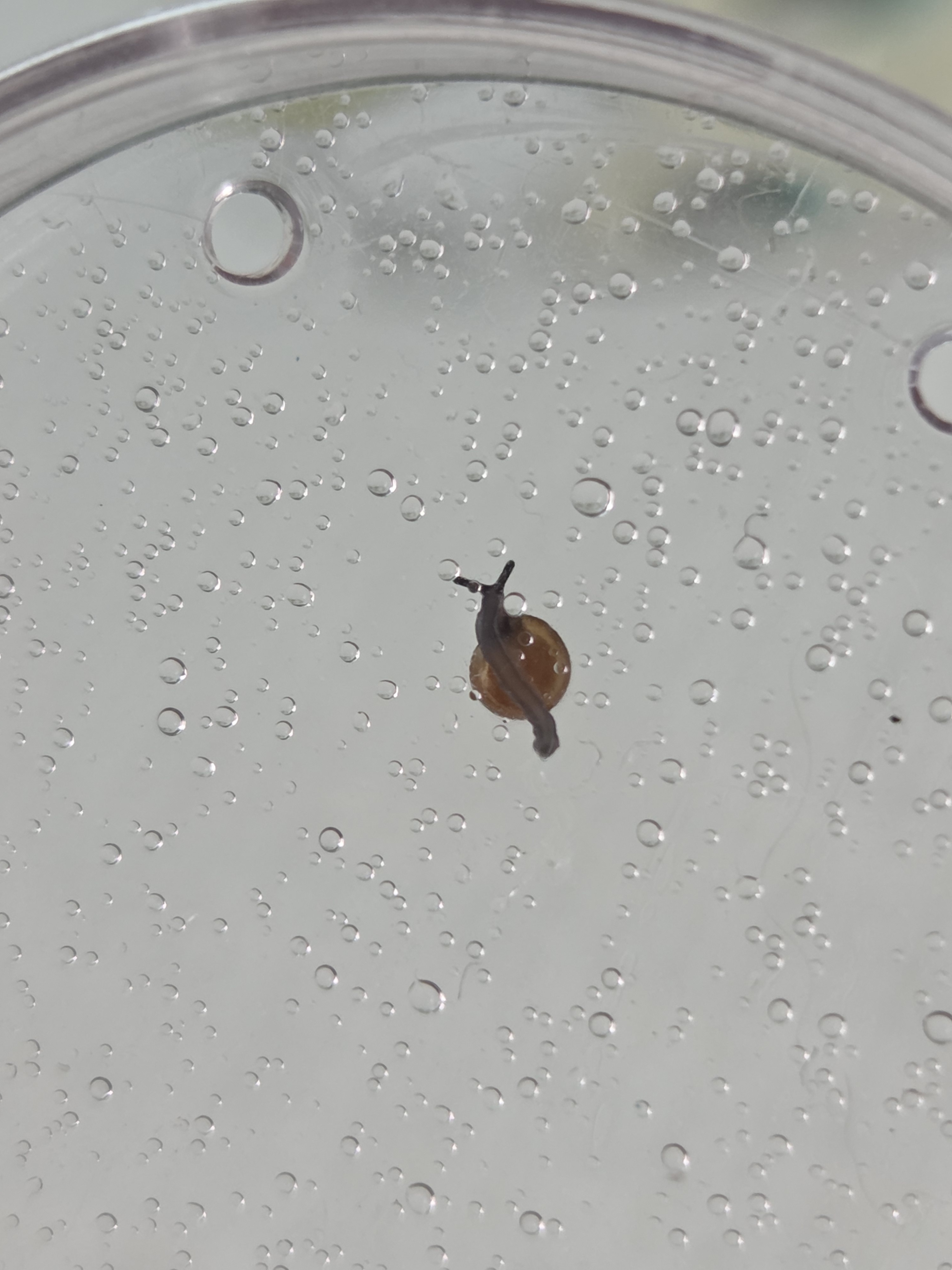
Characteristic tail of P. serica

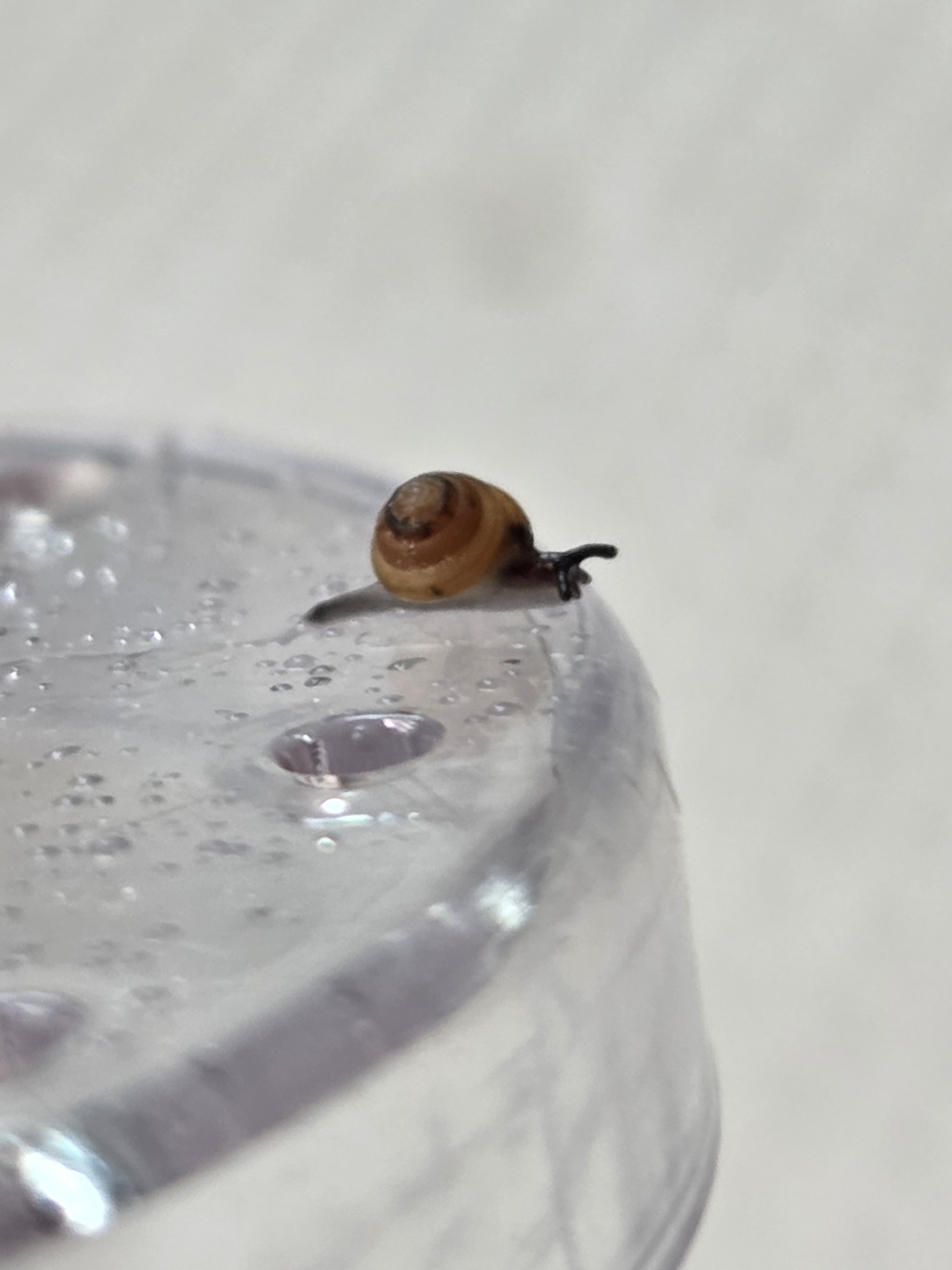
Side view

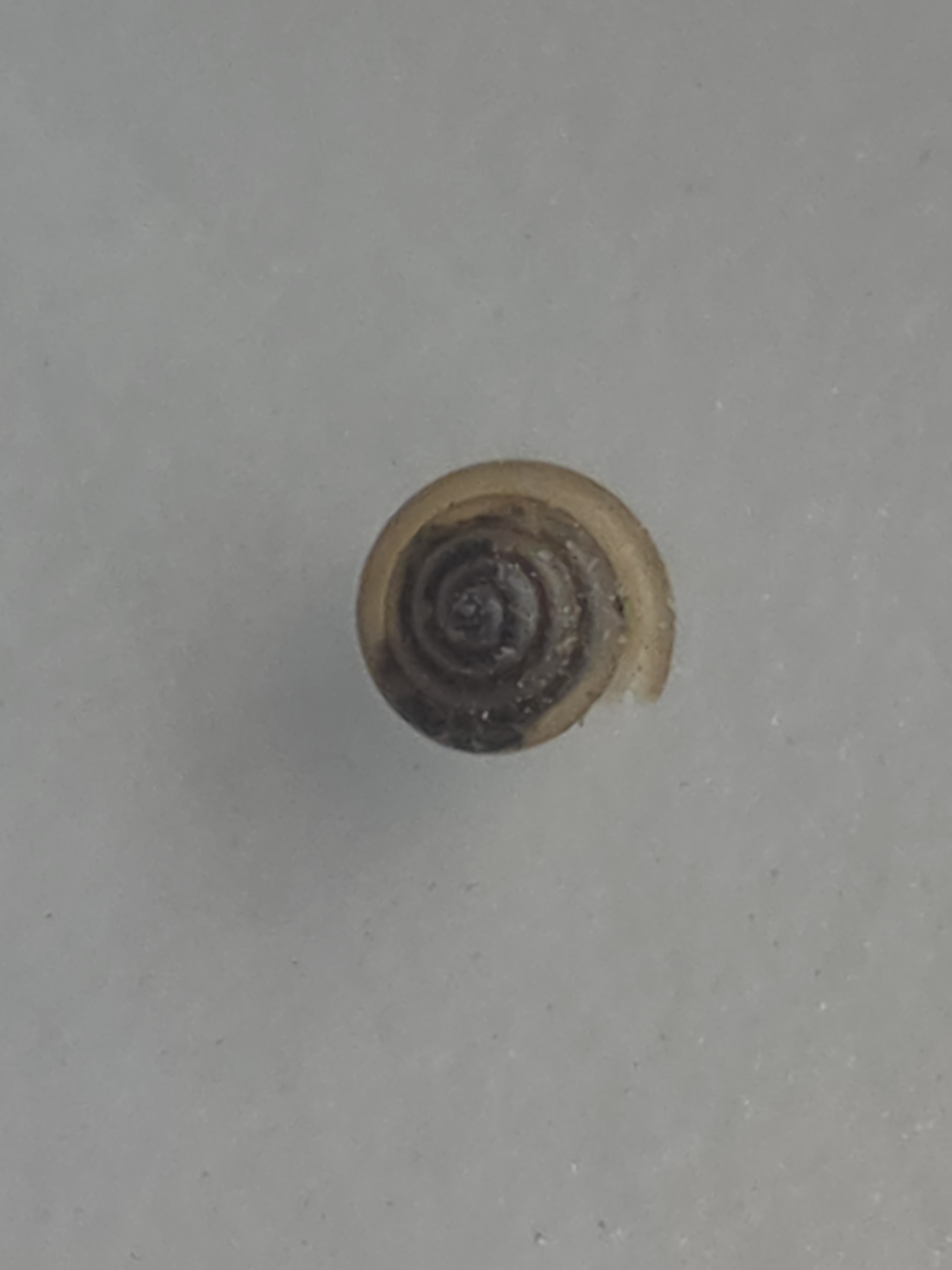
Apical view of the shell

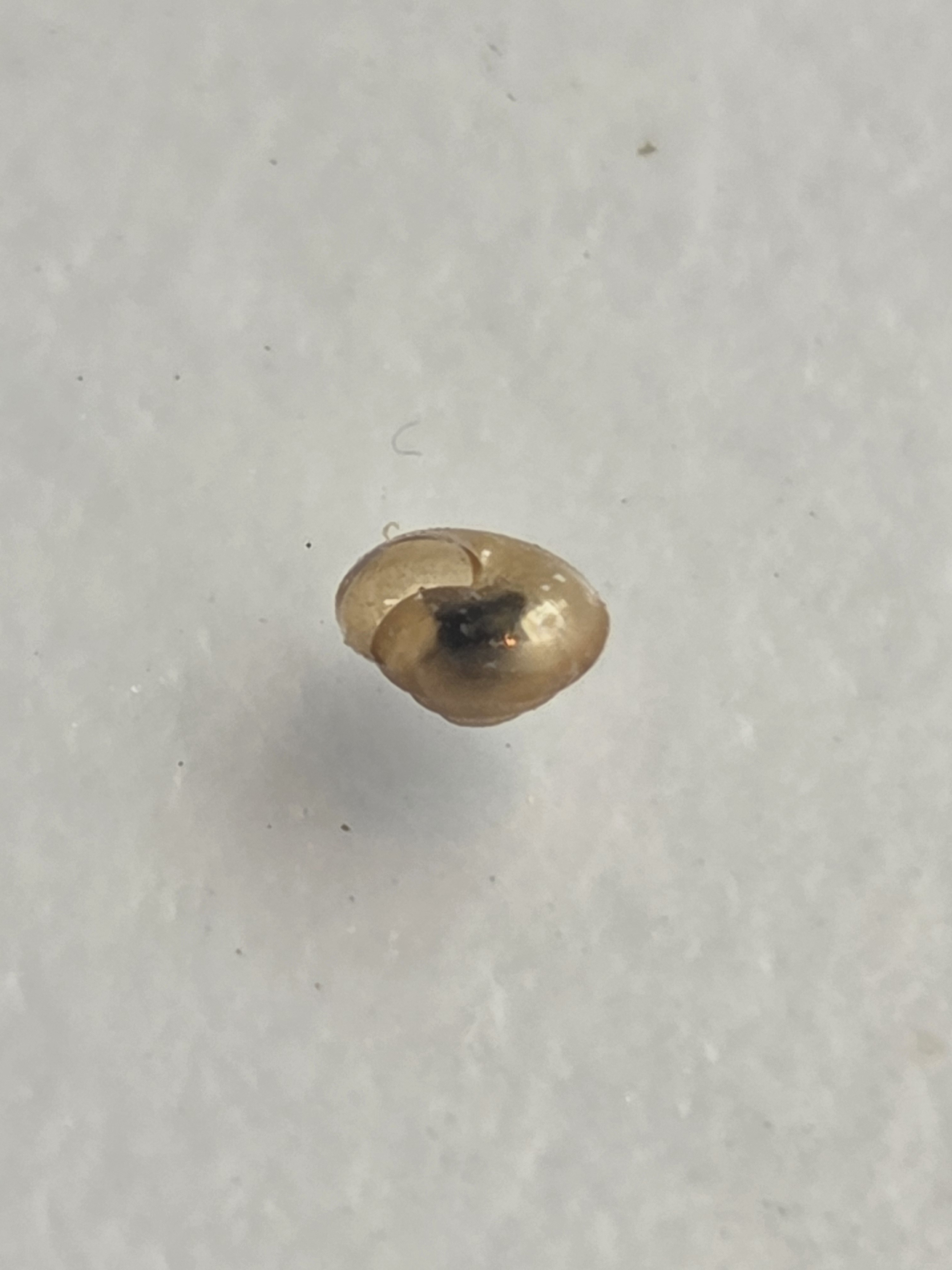
Umbilical view of the shell
