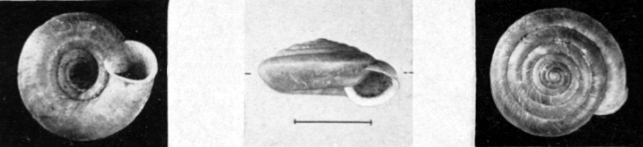
- Shell of Aegista chosenica (holotype)

Scientific classification
- Kingdom: Animalia
- Phylum: Mollusca
- Class: Gastropoda
- Order: Stylommatophora
- Family: Camaenidae
- Subfamily: Bradybaeninae
- Tribe: Aegistini
- Genus: Aegista
- Species: A. chosenica

Binomial name
- Aegista chosenica (Pilsbry, 1927)

Synonyms
- Eulota (Aegista) chosenica Pilsbry, 1927 (original combination)

= Aegista chosenica =

Species of gastropod

Aegista chosenica is a species of air-breathing land snails, a terrestrial pulmonate gastropod in the family Camaenidae.

== Description ==
The diameter of the shell attains 13.5 mm, its height 6.5 mm.

The shell presents a flattened, somewhat disc-shaped appearance with a low conoid spire and a wide-open umbilicus. Its structure is rather solid, boasting a dull, uniform brown hue that lacks luster. On the upper surface, dense, fine striations run throughout, appearing almost threadlike, primarily composed of cuticular material. The lower surface showcases fine, inconspicuous growth lines, accompanied by a subtle underlayer of minute, closely spaced spiral striations. Along the margin of the umbilicus, these striations are adorned with minuscule cuticular scales. The shell shows approximately 7 1/3 whorls, each moderately convex and very slowly expanding. The body whorl descends slightly at the front and forms a pronounced angle at the periphery, curving gracefully around the umbilicus. The aperture is small and obliquely rounded, bearing a semblance to a rounded-lunate shape. Its peristome, flesh-colored, exhibits an expanded upper margin, with the outer and basal margins reflecting prominently and featuring a noticeable thickening within. The parietal callus is very thin.

== Distribution ==
This species occurs on Korea The term "chosenica" refers to Chōsen, a Japanese name for Korea.
