= Fauna of South Korea =

Native animals of South Korea

South Korea, also known as Republic of Korea, is a nation located in East Asia. It is a part of the wider Korean Peninsula, with East, West, and South parts of the nation facing the sea. Despite South Korea's small territory, there are many medium and large sized animals.

As South Korea is part of Eurasia, its fauna have much in common with those of the wider continent.

== History ==
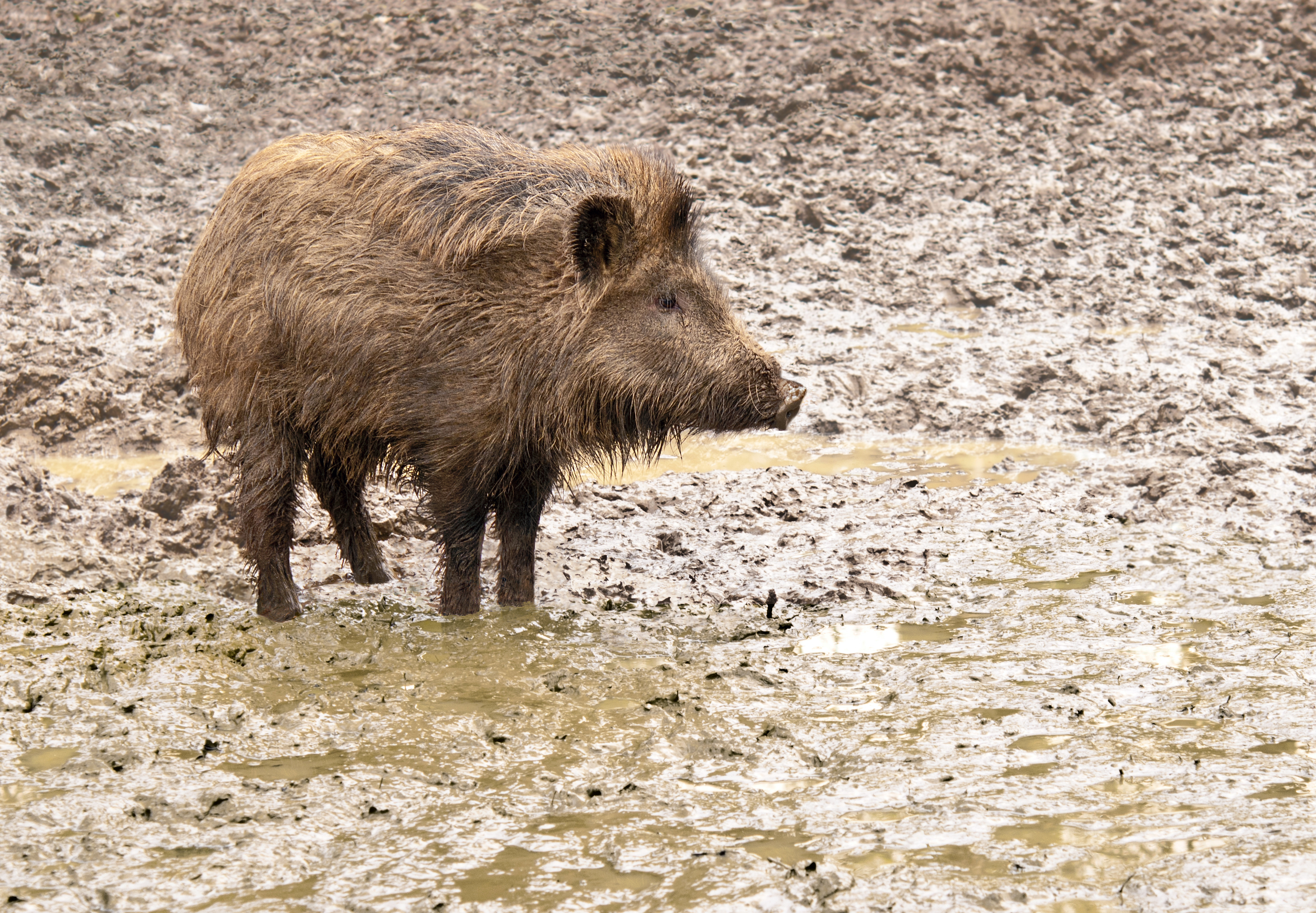
Wild Boar

Unlike livestock, which have become tamed for at least a few century and have a much different appearance and character to their inhabitants in the wild, wild animals have intrinsic characteristics. People are accustomed to be more familiar to livestock and often know their original form as livestock. But, the difference between the livestock and wild fauna is that livestock evolved in a direction favorable to human, whilst other fauna still consist their wild instinct. To have a clear insight of South Korea's wild fauna, In the case of wolves, unlike dogs that evolved to actively pursue cooperation with humans, they do not show any reliance on humans. The wild version of the pig, the Wild boar, is larger on average than the pigs used for food, and also has long hair with sharp tusks.

During the Japanese colonial era, vast number of wild fauna were poached leading some of the species to be threaten to potential extinction. Initially, the wild Tiger, which inhabited on the Korean Peninsula was a Siberian tiger subspecies. Although it was smaller than the Siberian tigers of Manchuria, it was widely distributed, with a significant population existing throughout the nation. However, due to increasing human population and modernization during the late Joseon Dynasty, its habitat was significantly reduced. In addition, systematic extermination campaigns carried out during both the Joseon Dynasty and the period of the Japanese Empire further accelerated its decline. Although tigers are apex predators at the top of the food chain, these combined pressures pushed the species toward near extinction. Currently, only a few individuals remain in the Korean Peninsula, confined to areas near the border with China.

Again, the Amur leopard on the Korean Peninsula, which had clearer markings and a smaller size compared to other leopards, was heavily hunted, subjected to systematic eradication campaigns, and suffered extensive habitat destruction during the Japanese colonial era. Nearly 2,000 individuals were killed, and only a few remain today in southeastern Russia and northern China. Recently, it has been reported that only about 3 individuals are preserved in zoos in South Korea.

The wolves that inhabited the Korean Peninsula are estimated to have been either the Mongolian wolf or the Korean wolf(Canis lupus coreanus), but due to a lack of DNA evidence, their exact subspecies classification remains unclear. They had dark brown fur compared to other wild wolves. During the same period, about 3,000 of them were hunted by hunters. Unlike other species, the wild wolves existed in Korean Peninsula eventually went extinct in the wild. Restoration effects are currently being undertaken by geneticists.

A fox on the Korean Peninsula belonging to the Korean fox were also widely hunted during the Japanese colonial era. It was hunted at random for the purpose of making luxury goods using their hair. Among Japanese ladies at the time, it was said that products made from Korean fox were fashionable. The wild fox were known to have been extinct for decades, but recently some were found in the wild. A very small number has yet to be found alive in the wild. It is urgently designated as a protected species and is dedicated to the study and conservation of species. However, even now, the few remaining numbers are decreasing due to illegal poaching.

Dokdo was once home to a large group of Japanese sea lion. However, as Japanese fishermen started to poach, more than 100,000 number of sea lions were poached. The group of sea lions that once inhabited this area are now extinct as a species.

== Ecology ==
Korea is located between 33 ° and 43 ° N, the eastern end of the Eurasian continent. It is rich in precipitation and has various seasonal climate characteristics. In Korea, there are large proportion of areas occupied by mountains, and mainly mountains are distributed in the north and east part of the nation. Large and gentle rivers flow along west and south, and there are various erosion and sediment terrains along the rivers. On the southern coast, there are many islands and complex coastlines, and a wide tideline appears on the west coast. Dunes and lagoons are developed along the monotonous coastline on the east coast.

The habitat of wild forest has been damaged or cut off every year due to the development of roads and industrial complexes, and the total area of forests of 67,000 m^{2} is reduced annually by farmland, new city, industrial complex development.

In addition, Korea is expected to suffer sustain warming and increased precipitation due to climate change. Also, frequent and intense extreme climate is expected. It is estimated that after 2071, South Korea will enter the sub-tropical climate, with the exception of some high altitudes in Baekdudaegan. Furthermore, In the forecast of the spatial distribution of precipitation, it is expected that the areas with more than 1,600mm of annual precipitation will increase gradually in Jeju and some parts of the southern coast, and after 2040, in Gangwon, South region of the country and Jeju. This threats changes in the species throughout the biodiversity and result ecosystem disturbance. 18 species of vertebrates, 28 species of invertebrates, 44 species of plants, and 10 species of fungi and algae are mainly expected to be threatened.

== Law ==
There are a total of 10 laws related to protected areas in Korea. Among the 10 laws, the three laws including the Natural Environment Conservation Act, the Marine Environment Management Act, and the Cultural Properties Protection Act provide general provisions for protection of natural environments and cultural properties. It specifies contents about designation of area. The other seven laws contain the management of the designated area as the main contents, and the provisions for the designation and management of the protected area for the object of preservation are stipulated.

Changes in Law
Time of the Year	Law
1911. 04 ~	First Wildlife Protection Act
1961.12 ~	Introduction of illegal poaching Act
1967. 03 ~	Supplementation and restriction of hunting
1983.12 ~	Strengthen illegal poaching law Introduced import and export licensing system
1994. 03 ~	Adoption of prohibition of abuse of newly established assistant regulations on management of endangered species on import and export
1997. 08 ~	Strengthening wildlife reservoir management system (control of access to breeding area)
1999. 03 ~	Abolition of the artificial rearing permit system of wild fauna

== Diversity ==
=== Species ===
The number of living species in Korea is estimated to be about 100,000 species. So far, 42,756 species have been recorded. Out of whole, 25,453 species have been recorded in the animal family, which comprises 59.5% of the total recorded species. When divided more specifically, 1,936 species are vertebrates, 102 species are resting animals and 23,415 species are invertebrates.

Korea is a peninsula located in Northeast Asia. Ecologically, Baekdu Mountain Alpine Zone and two large rivers isolate the Korean Peninsula from the continent. The Yalu River in the northwest of the Korean Peninsula and the Tumen River in the northeast play a role in limiting the movement of wildlife from China and Russia. Therefore, the isolation by Tuman and Yalu rivers from the Korean Peninsula shows that the percentage of endemic species of freshwater fish and insects to be high. An endemic species refers to a species of organism that lives only in geographically limited areas or countries, and represents species that live only in that area all over the world. Of the 100,000 species currently identified, approximately 10% are believed to be endemic species in Korea. Four species of mammals, four species of algae, five species of amphibians, one species of reptiles and 59 species are known as endemic species in Korea.

Amongst, 246 species of endangered wildlife (Class I and II), there are 166 animal species. Out of 35,569 species of internationally endangered species (I, II and III), there are 5,659 animal species.31 species of wildlife are prohibited from eating, 479 species of wildlife are prohibited from capturing, 568 species of wild animals are prohibited to be exported and licensed. In the case of marine life, 77 kinds of endangered species living in the marine or coastal area and domestic endemics.

In order to preserve endangered species, the Korean Government has designated certain species as natural monuments.

=== Habitat ===
Various climatic changes and complex terrain have also contributed to the emergence of diverse ecosystems, which have led to greater biodiversity. Deciduous broad-leaved forests are present in the northern part whereas subalpine coniferous forests are present in the central part. Temperate evergreen forests are present in the south part as well as in the island areas. Characteristics of such forests have resulted different fauna to survive in different regions. On the northern part of the country, where, deciduous broad-leaved forests are present, shrewmouse, rabbits, wolves, fox, tigers and lynx are mostly present. On the central part of the country where subalpine coniferous forests are present, mole, raccoon and wildcat widely exist. On the southern part of the country, bats, sea lion, dolphins and seal widely exist.

One of the unique aspect of South Korea's fauna environment is that they have a demilitarized zone. Demilitarized zone has been designated as a 2 km zone (4 km in total) between North and South, centered on the MDL (Military Demarcation Line) since the Korean War. The southern boundary of the Demilitarized Zone is the SLL (Southern Limit Line) and the northern boundary is the NLL (Northern Limit Line). For over 60 years, The area has been strictly forbidden for public activities, preserving natural ecosystems, and attracting attention as Asia's largest protected area.

One of the characteristics of the DMZ is that the wetland ecosystem is well formed. In the region there are a wide variety of wetlands ranging from valley wetlands in the eastern region to lowland wetlands in the western region. This is where many people lived and built rice fields in the past. These places have been left as wetland ecosystems for 60 years after the Korean War. The wetland ecosystem of the DMZ shows how past farmlands and lowlands developed into wetlands. The Han River estuary where the Cheorwon Plain area, Panmunjom area, Imjin river and the Han river meet with the west coast plays an important role as the final destination for the migratory birds. In Cheorwon Plain, more than 3,000 eagles come to spend winter each year.

DMZ has the most biodiversity in Korea in terms of distribution of mammals and algae, which is the peak of the natural ecosystem. The largest number of natural monuments and species of endangered species such as bears, foxes, musk deer and other species are present in this region. The DMZ is well developed with rivers and wetlands, and holds a variety of fish species and abundant populations.

In addition, plant distribution of DMZ is also unique. It is home to a variety of species including endangered wild animals and plants, such as parasitic flowers, winged larks, and plum blossoms. These naturalized plants are mainly dandelion, swine grass, maple leaf swine and evening primrose. In particular, maple leaves and pig grasses originating in North America are threatened by indigenous plant ecosystems. These alien species were estimated to have been handed over to Korea by the US army at the time of the Korean War. Thus, the DMZ has a unique natural ecosystem that can not be seen elsewhere, and is a place of study that shows the process of changing natural ecosystems after the war.

Currently, the DMZ may be better known abroad than in Korea. Increasing number of people come and visit the region. The International Union for Conservation of Nature (IUCN) and the United Nations Environment Program (UNEP) have been organizing the DMZ International Environmental Park on both sides of the Korean Peninsula. South Korea is also striving to designate the preservation area of UNESCO Border Biosphere Reserve, to certify UNESCO World Geological Park, and to designate UNESCO World Heritage.

== See also ==
- Wildlife of South Korea

== Bibliography ==
- https://www.cbd.int/doc/world/kr/kr-nr-05-en.pdf
- https://www.cbd.int/doc/world/kr/kr-nbsap-v3-en.pdf
