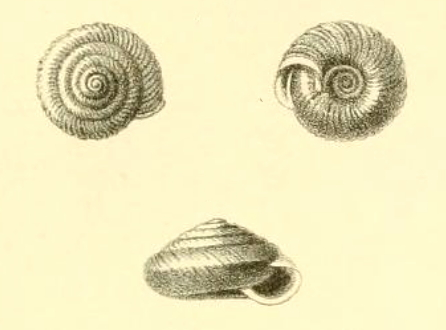
- Shell of Aegista gottschei (holotype)

Scientific classification
- Kingdom: Animalia
- Phylum: Mollusca
- Class: Gastropoda
- Order: Stylommatophora
- Family: Camaenidae
- Genus: Aegista
- Species: A. gottschei

Binomial name
- Aegista gottschei (Möllendorff, 1887)
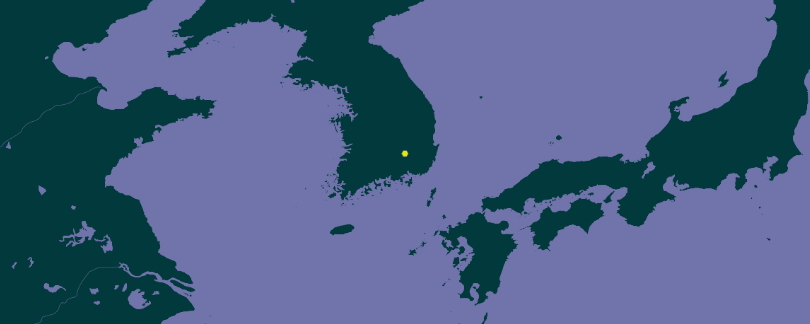

Synonyms
- Aegista gottschei kongoensis Kuroda & Miyanaga, 1939 (junior synonym); Eulota (Aegista) gottschei (Möllendorff, 1887); Eulota (Aegista) mimula peninsularis Pilsbry & Y. Hirase, 1909 (junior synonym); Helix (Aegista) gottschei Möllendorff, 1887 (original combination)

= Aegista gottschei =

Species of gastropod

Aegista gottschei is a species of air-breathing land snails, a terrestrial pulmonate gastropod in the family Camaenidae. It was first described in 1887 by Otto Franz von Mollendorff as Helix (Aegista) gottschei. The species epithet honours Carl Christian Gottsche who collected this snail in Korea.

== Subspecies ==
- Aegista gottschei fusanica (Pilsbry, 1927)
- Aegista gottschei gottschei (Möllendorff, 1887)

== Description ==
The diameter of the shell is 11 mm.

The shell has a wide umbilicus. It shows delicately oblique striae, and has a membranous costulation, with microscopic spiraling lines. The shell presents a brownish corneous hue. Its contains 6-7 whorls, each gently convex, with the body whorl obtusely angulated and minutely deflected forward. The peristome is thin, modestly expanded, and somewhat reflected.

== Distribution ==
This species occurs in Korea. It is endemic to Korea, where it is found under decayed broadleaf trees.
