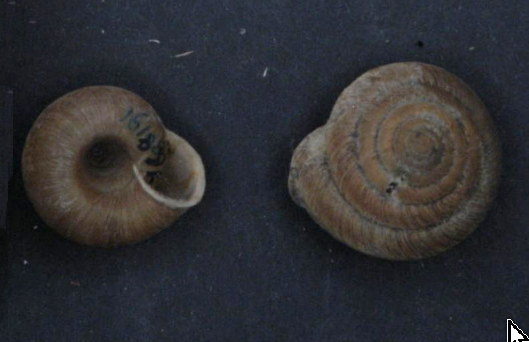
- Shell of Aegista oculus (specimen at Naturalis Biodiversity Center)

Scientific classification
- Kingdom: Animalia
- Phylum: Mollusca
- Class: Gastropoda
- Order: Stylommatophora
- Family: Camaenidae
- Subfamily: Bradybaeninae
- Tribe: Aegistini
- Genus: Aegista
- Species: A. oculus

Binomial name
- Aegista oculus (L. Pfeiffer, 1850)
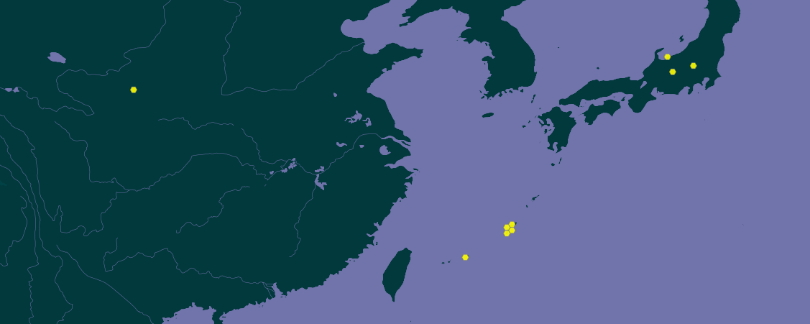

Synonyms
- Aegista (Aegista) oculus (L. Pfeiffer, 1850) (no subgenera are recognized); Helix oculus L. Pfeiffer, 1850 (original combination); Helix typinsana A. Adams & Reeve, 1850 junior subjective synonym

= Aegista oculus =

Species of gastropod

Aegista oculus is a species of air-breathing land snails, a terrestrial pulmonate gastropod in the family Camaenidae.

== Description ==
The diameter of the shell attains 25 mm.

The shell presents a notable wide umbilicus and possesses a relatively thin texture. The shell is closely rugosely plicate above. It exhibits a brownish hue. The suture is impressed. The shell comprises 8 whorls, each slightly convex. The body whorl descends shortly towards the front with a subtly angular periphery accented by white banding. The base of the shell maintains a convex shape with visible striae. Its outer lip is thin featuring a slight angular reflection.

== Distribution ==
This species occurs in Myanmar, India, China, Korea and Java Indonesia.
