= Environment of North Korea =

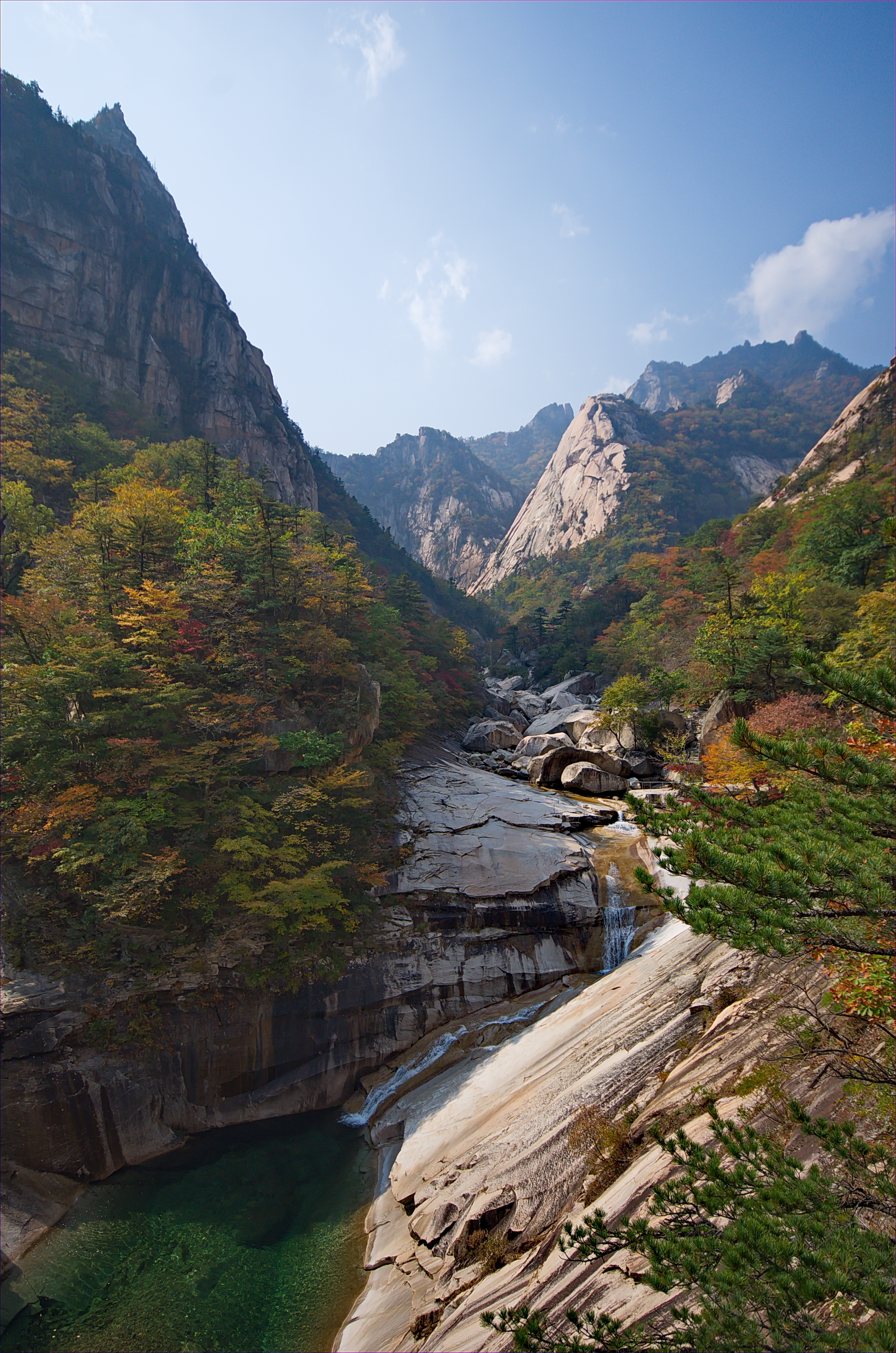
Kumgang Mountain

The environment of North Korea comprises the diverse ecosystems of the part of the Korean peninsula controlled by the Democratic People's Republic of Korea. This includes alpine, forest, farmland, freshwater, and marine ecosystems.

Since the 1980s, the environment has been reported to be in a state of "crisis", "catastrophe", or "collapse". Pollution and deforestation are key problems. However, this has been contested by some accounts. In addition, North Korea has some environmental programs to mitigate the problems.

== Overview ==
More than 80 percent of North Korea is mountainous with cultivation largely confined to coastal strips in the east and west. According to a United Nations Environmental Programme report in 2003, forest covers over 70 percent of the country, mostly on steep slopes. However, other studies have suggested that, due to deforestation, forest cover was only about 50%. There are nine rivers and numerous smaller waterways. The environment is correspondingly diverse, consisting of alpine, forest, farmland, freshwater, and marine ecosystems.

Due to its geological history, the country has a range of vegetation, from the subtropical, temperate and frigid zones, which are able to coexist due to the combined effects of oceanic and continental climates. The climate has pronounced seasonal variations, with warm summers and snowfall in winter.

== Biodiversity ==
In 2003, animal and plant species in North Korea were reported to be "profuse". Four percent of the higher plant species were reported to be endangered, vulnerable, rare, or in decline. Eleven percent of vertebrate species were reported to be critically endangered, endangered, or rare.

In 2013 a delegation of visiting scientists reported major environmental devastation. They described an absence of wildlife and said that the "landscape is basically dead". This situation was described as "so severe it could destabilize the whole country".

However, a group of birdwatchers from the Pukorokoro Miranda Naturalists' Trust, New Zealand, visited the Yellow Sea shore of Mundŏk County in South P'yŏngan province in 2016 and reported that the mudflats there were a haven for bird life. The relative lack of development there compared to nearby China and South Korea had provided a refuge for several internationally important birds on their migration along the East Asian-Australasian Flyway - such as the critically endangered eastern curlew, the Eurasian curlew and the bar-tailed godwit.

=== Flora ===
The flora of North Korea has much in common with that of other areas of the Northern Hemisphere. 2898 species have been recorded, of which 14% are endemic. Four are classified as threatened.

The native plant communities in the lowlands have largely disappeared with cultivation and urbanisation. Native conifer forest communities are located in the highlands. The forest types are mainly subarctic (boreal) and cool-temperate forest.

== Environmental issues ==
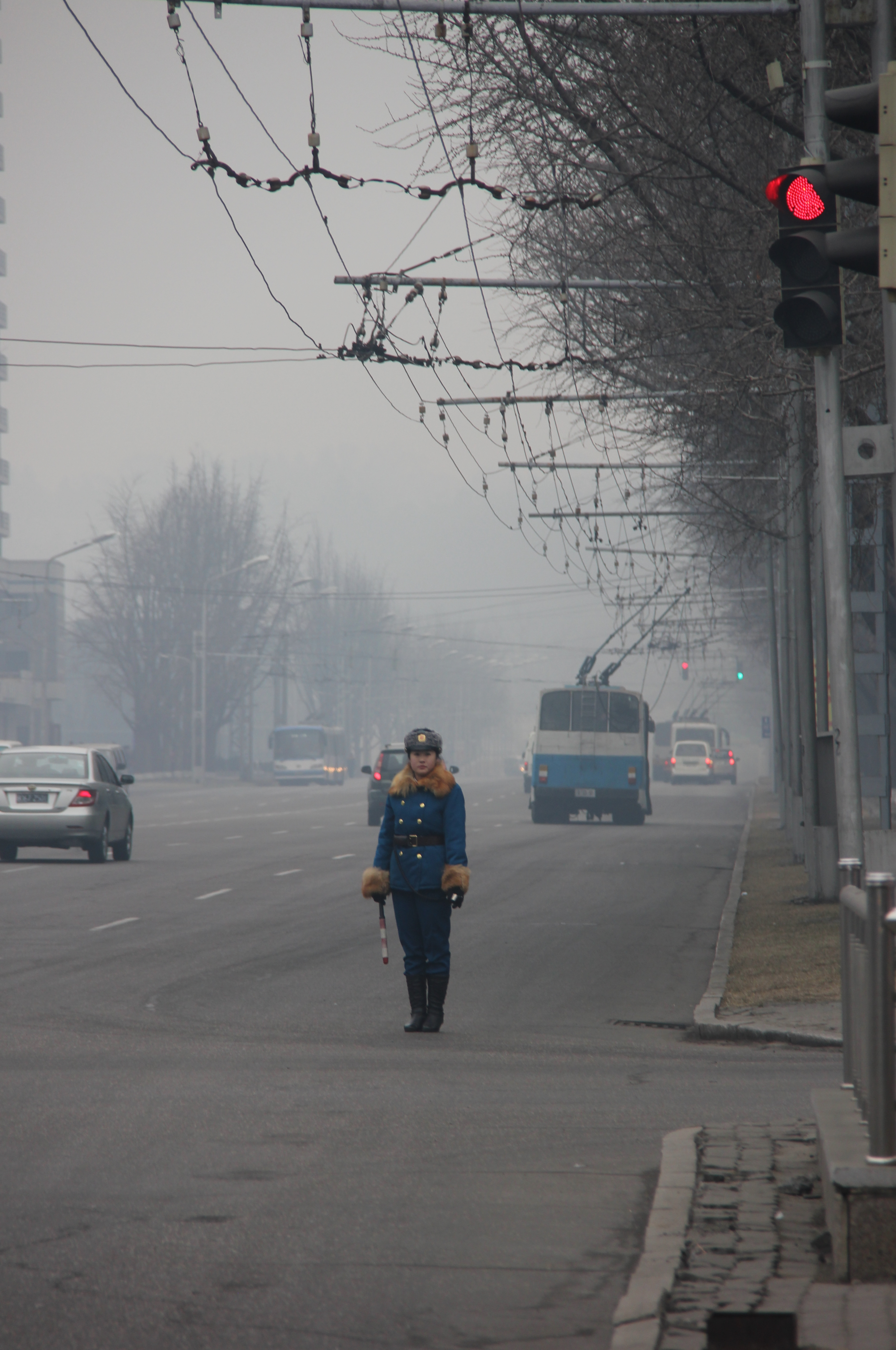
Smog at street level in Pyongyang

=== Pollution ===
In 2003, air pollution in Pyongyang, largely due to combustion of coal, was reported to be unacceptable. This is somewhat mitigated by the high use of public transport in urban areas.

In 2003, the pollution of rivers and streams was reported to be "severe" due to a decrease in investment in environmental protection and the improper discharge of untreated sewage and industrial effluent. The quality of the Taedong River, which flows through Pyongyang, was reported to be "deteoriating", exacerbated by the construction of the West Sea Barrage. A survey conducted in 2017 found that 93% of sanitation facilities were not connected to a sewage system. Rather, the human waste was used as fertilizer on fields, creating the potential health risk of spreading intestinal worms.

North Korea produces large quantities of DDT and other pesticides.

=== Deforestation ===
Cultivation, logging, and natural disasters have all put pressure on North Korea's forests. During the economic crisis of the 1990s, deforestation accelerated, as people turned to the woodlands to provide firewood and food. This in turn has led to soil erosion, soil depletion, and increased risk of flooding.

Based on satellite imagery in 2013, it has been estimated that 40 percent of forest cover has been lost since 1985. The United Nations Environmental Programme in 2003 reported a much smaller rate of depletion.

A forest restoration policy has been in place since 2012, especially on hillsides around Pyongyang and in South Pyongan Province. However deforestation appears to continue in remote areas. New crop cultivation of slopes exceeding 15 degrees has been banned to help prevent erosion and landslides.

In 2018, North Korea had a Forest Landscape Integrity Index mean score of 8.02/10, ranking it 28th globally out of 172 countries. Satellite analysis of North Korean land in 2019 indicated forests accounted for 45%, farmland for 27% and grasslands for 13%.

In recent years, forest cover has been growing at 0.2% every year up to 45% in 2019, with forests reemerging especially around Pyongyang, although in some rural areas, deforestation has still occurred, due to wood being an easy source of fuel in the countryside. This pattern continues as of 2026, as suggested by South Korean analysis of satellite imagery.

=== Tree cover extent and loss ===
Global Forest Watch publishes annual estimates of tree cover loss and 2000 tree cover extent derived from time-series analysis of Landsat satellite imagery in the Global Forest Change dataset. In this framework, tree cover refers to vegetation taller than 5 m (including natural forests and tree plantations), and tree cover loss is defined as the complete removal of tree cover canopy for a given year, regardless of cause.

For North Korea, country statistics report cumulative tree cover loss of 293,118 ha (2,931.18 km^{2}) from 2001 to 2024 (about 5.6% of its 2000 tree cover area). For tree cover density greater than 30%, country statistics report a 2000 tree cover extent of 5,195,566 ha (51,955.66 km^{2}). The charts and table below display this data. In simple terms, the annual loss number is the area where tree cover disappeared in that year, and the extent number shows what remains of the 2000 tree cover baseline after subtracting cumulative loss. Forest regrowth is not included in the dataset.

Annual tree cover loss in North Korea, 2001–2024. View chart definition.
Tree cover extent in 2000 minus cumulative tree cover loss in North Korea, 2001–2024 (loss-only residual; does not account for gain). View chart definition.

Annual tree cover extent and loss
Year	Tree cover extent (km2) (Note: This residual measure does not include forest regrowth.)	Annual tree cover loss (km2)
2001	51,836.22	119.44
2002	51,782.65	53.57
2003	51,709.17	73.48
2004	51,595.60	113.57
2005	51,430.36	165.24
2006	51,304.57	125.79
2007	51,171.69	132.88
2008	50,983.87	187.82
2009	50,852.74	131.13
2010	50,662.60	190.14
2011	50,608.38	54.22
2012	50,441.57	166.81
2013	50,391.35	50.22
2014	50,281.94	109.41
2015	50,173.42	108.52
2016	50,058.54	114.88
2017	49,973.33	85.21
2018	49,896.41	76.92
2019	49,621.49	274.92
2020	49,473.74	147.75
2021	49,336.32	137.42
2022	49,245.85	90.47
2023	49,144.66	101.19
2024	49,024.48	120.18

=== Climate change ===
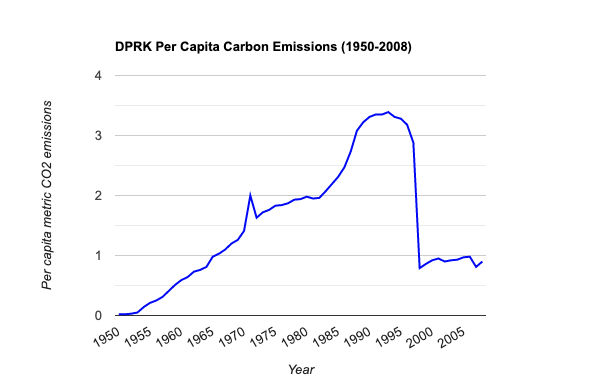
Per capita CO_{2} emissions of North Korea (1950-2008)

North Korea is highly vulnerable to the effects of climate change due to its weak food security, which in the past has led to widespread famine. The North Korean Ministry of Land and Environmental Protection estimates that North Korea's average temperature rose by 1.9 °C between 1918 and 2000. In the 2013 edition of Germanwatch's Climate Risk Index, North Korea was judged to be the seventh hardest hit by climate-related extreme weather events of 179 nations during the period 1992–2011.

North Korean carbon dioxide emissions are estimated to be roughly 56.38 million metric tons of CO_{2} in 2021. The vast majority of this is due to North Korea's reliance on coal for energy production. As a result of its mountainous geography as well as the onset of sea level rise and increasing frequency of extreme weather events, the biggest climate change-related concern for North Korea is food security. Low food production in 2017 and 2018 resulted in undernourishment in an estimated 10.3 million people. This has created a high dependency on foreign nations to fulfil food demands. This challenge - along with disruption to economic growth as a result of climate change - might undermine the totalitarian rule of the North Korean government and may be a cause for regime change in the future.

== Environmental programs ==
In response to the deforestation problem, North Korea has implemented a tree planting program. In 2016, the Korean Central News Agency reported that the Central Nursery under the Ministry of Land and Environment Protection had produced 90 million saplings over the past five years for distribution around the country. Official pronouncements have labeled illegal forest destruction as "treachery" and threatened perpetrators with the death penalty. In 2017, Kim Il Sung University announced the opening of a new Forest Science Department. In 2018, North Korea made an agreement with the South on forestry co-operation.

In 2025, satellite images analysed by South Korean newspaper Daily NK suggest that the DPRK had managed to restore 1.2 million hectares of forest since 2015, representing 72.7% of the 1.68 million hectare target. In 2026, North Korea launched the "Second 10-Year Reforestation Campaign", declaring forest restoration a "core national policy".

The North Korean government has ratified the Kyoto Protocol on global warming and has been co-operating with international efforts to combat climate change. It has invested in the development of solar and other renewable energy technology. In 2017, the Foreign Ministry condemned the US government for withdrawing from the Paris Agreement.

North Korea has participated in international environmental projects, such as the conservation of the red-crowned crane. In 2017, Pyongyang hosted a workshop on the conservation of wetlands and migratory waterbirds, attended by the International Union for Conservation of Nature, the Hanns Seidel Foundation, and the East Asian Australasian Flyway Partnership.

While recycling of materials in North Korea has always been a practice, a new law in 2020 gave it a much higher profile and required organizations to recycle. A national recycling plan stipulated the minimum recycling quantity for certain materials, and placed requirements at the province, county and city levels. Economic reasons are a strong driver of this effort, reducing some imports.

== Gallery ==
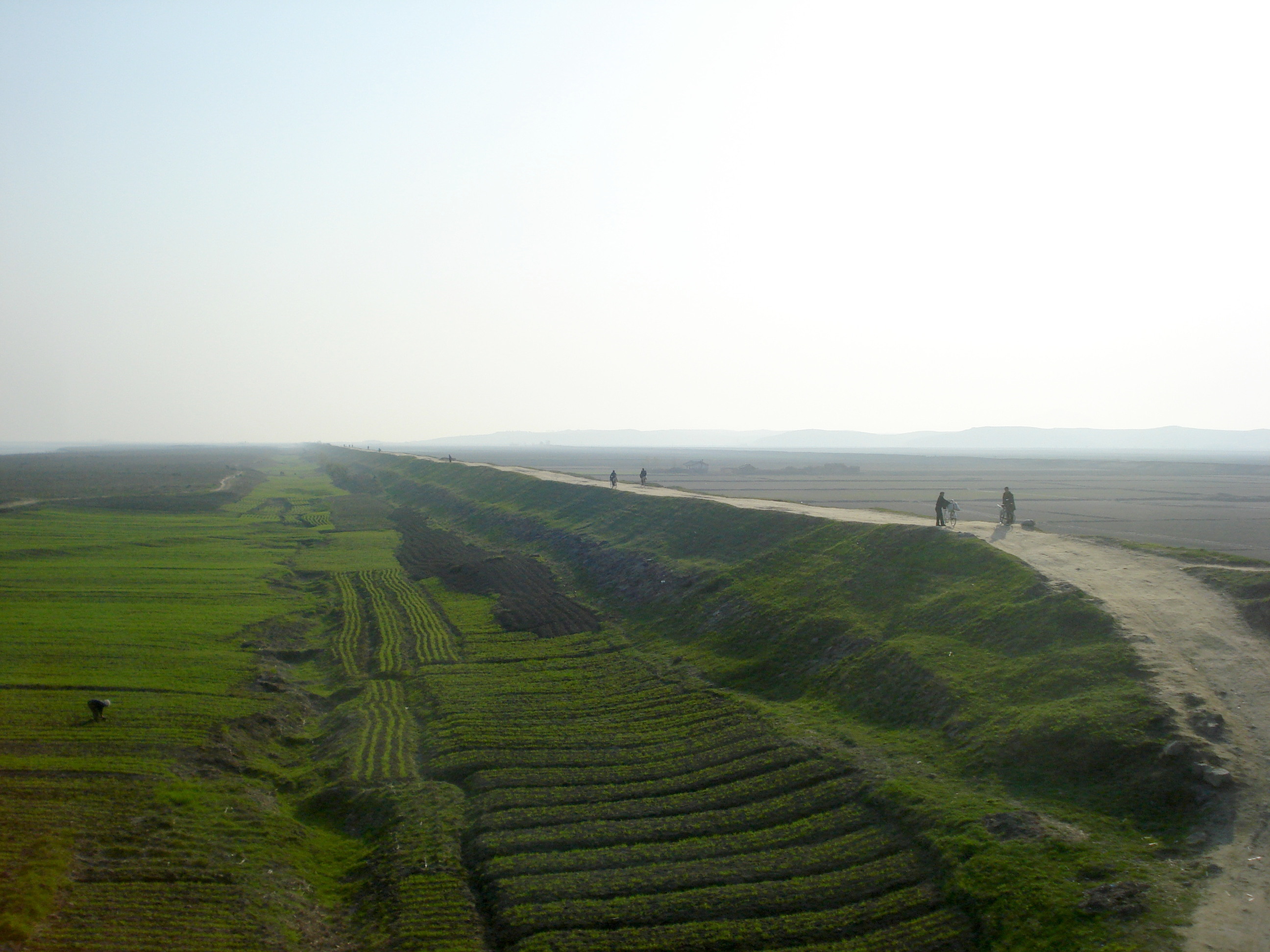
A North Korean agricultural landscape

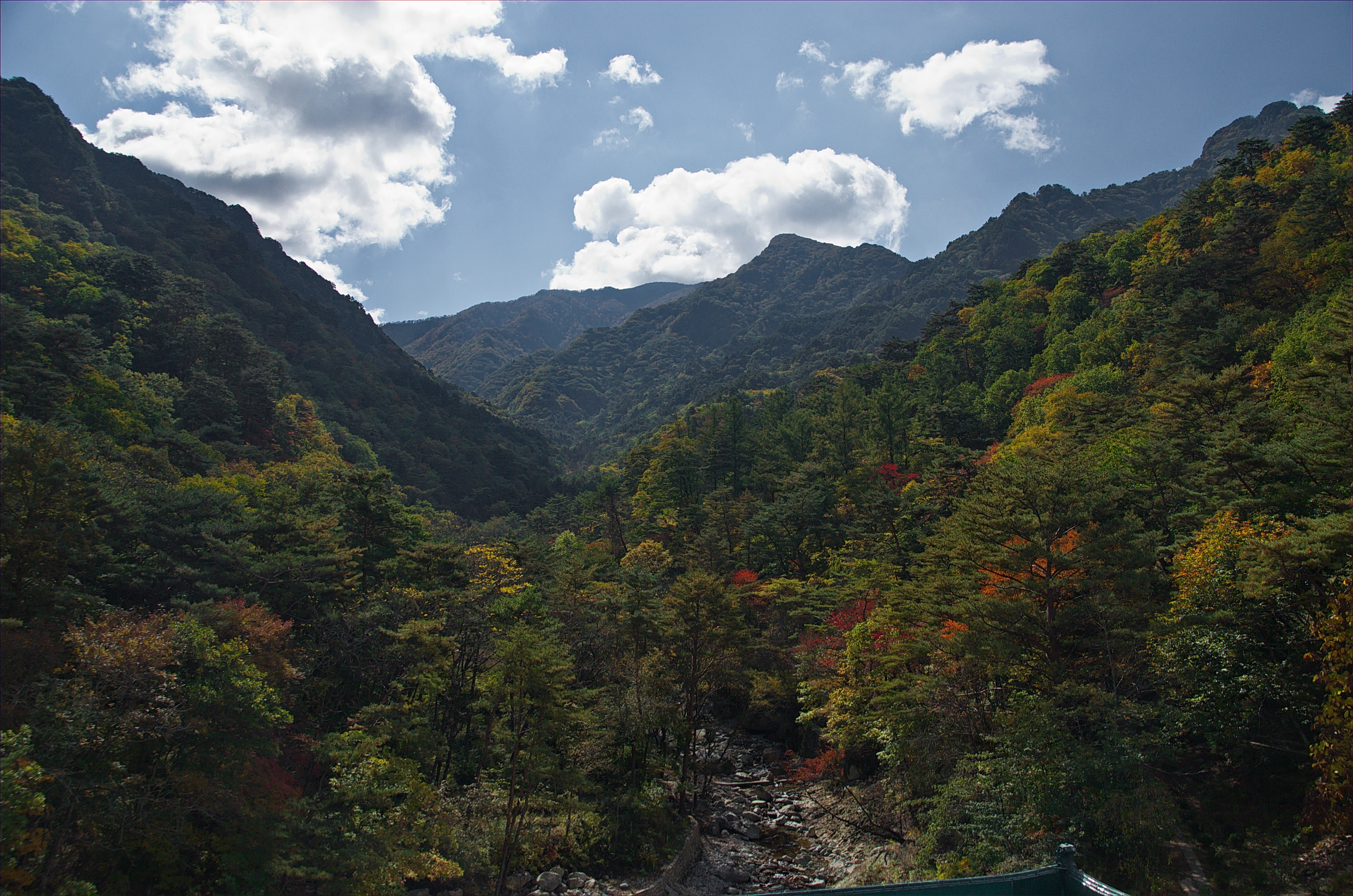
Myohyang Mountain

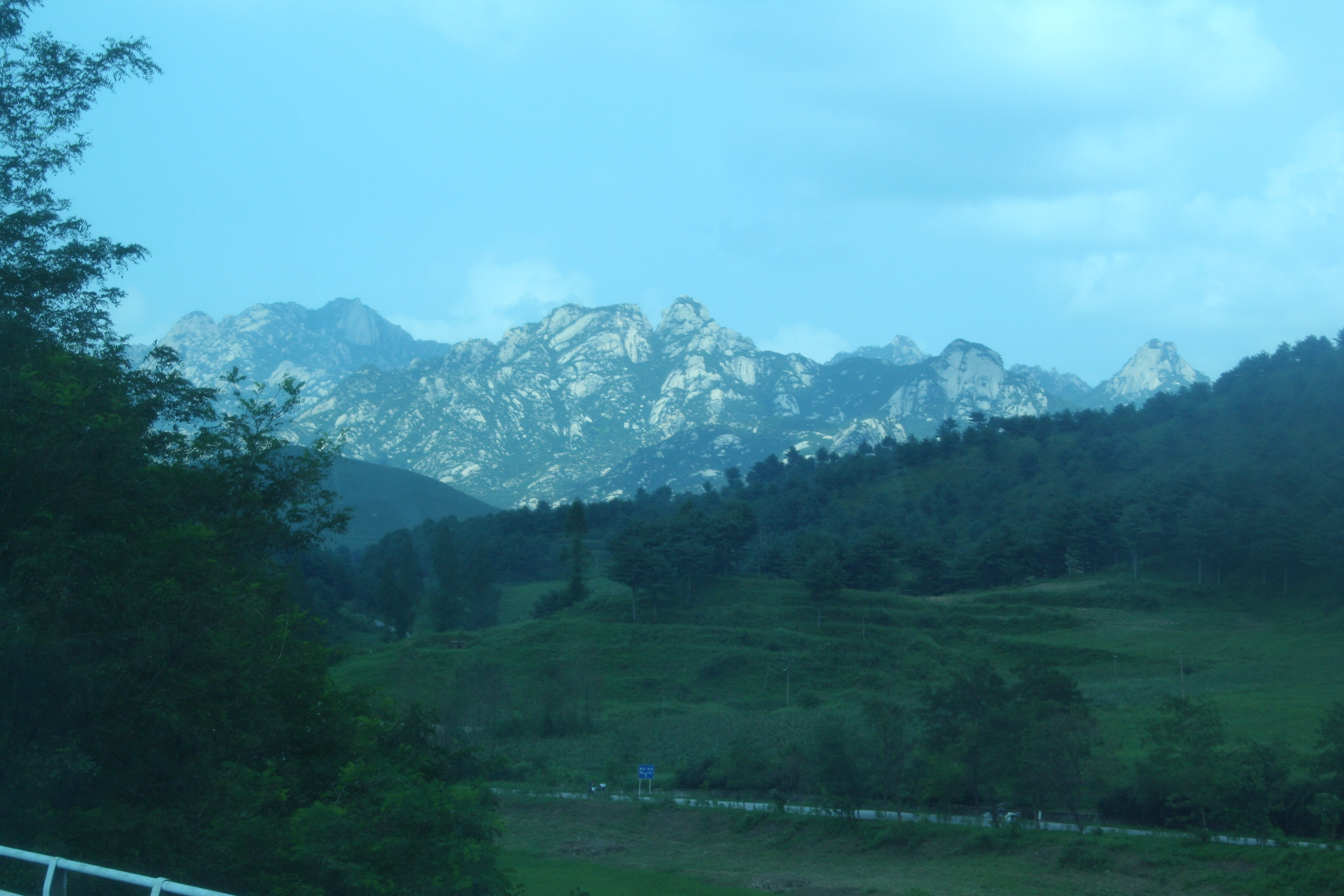
North Korean countryside

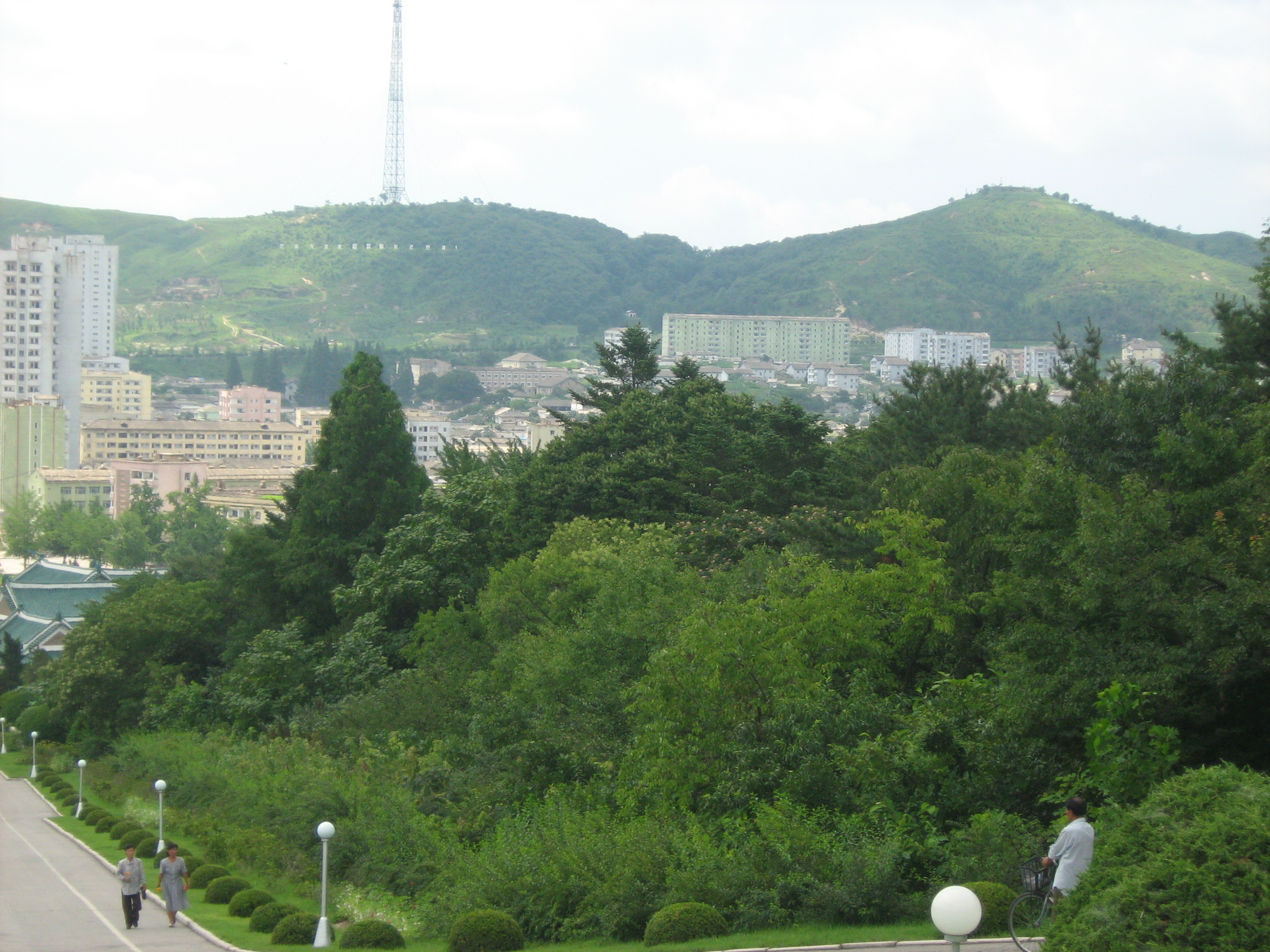
Forested slopes around Kaesong

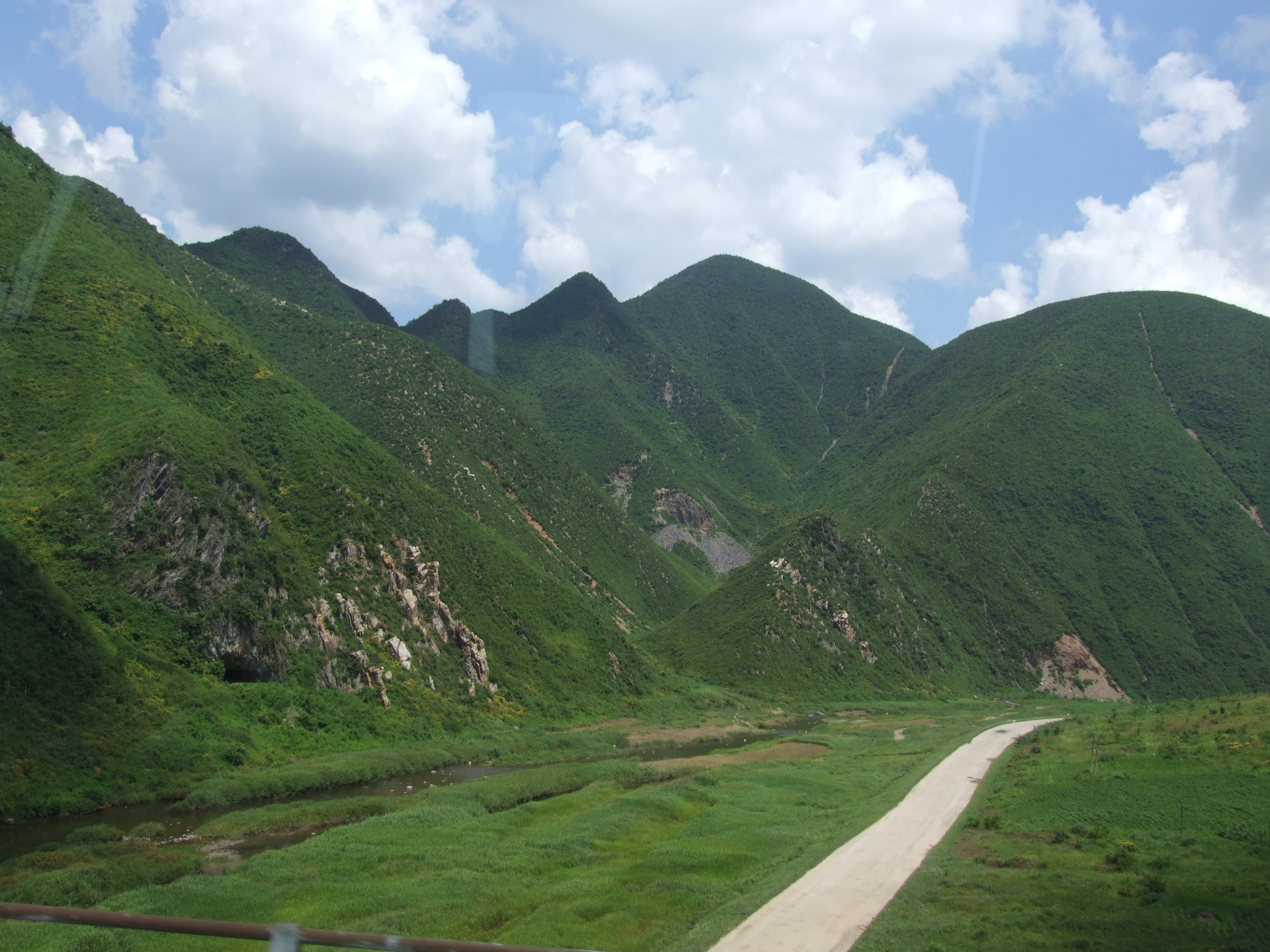
Mountains in North Korea

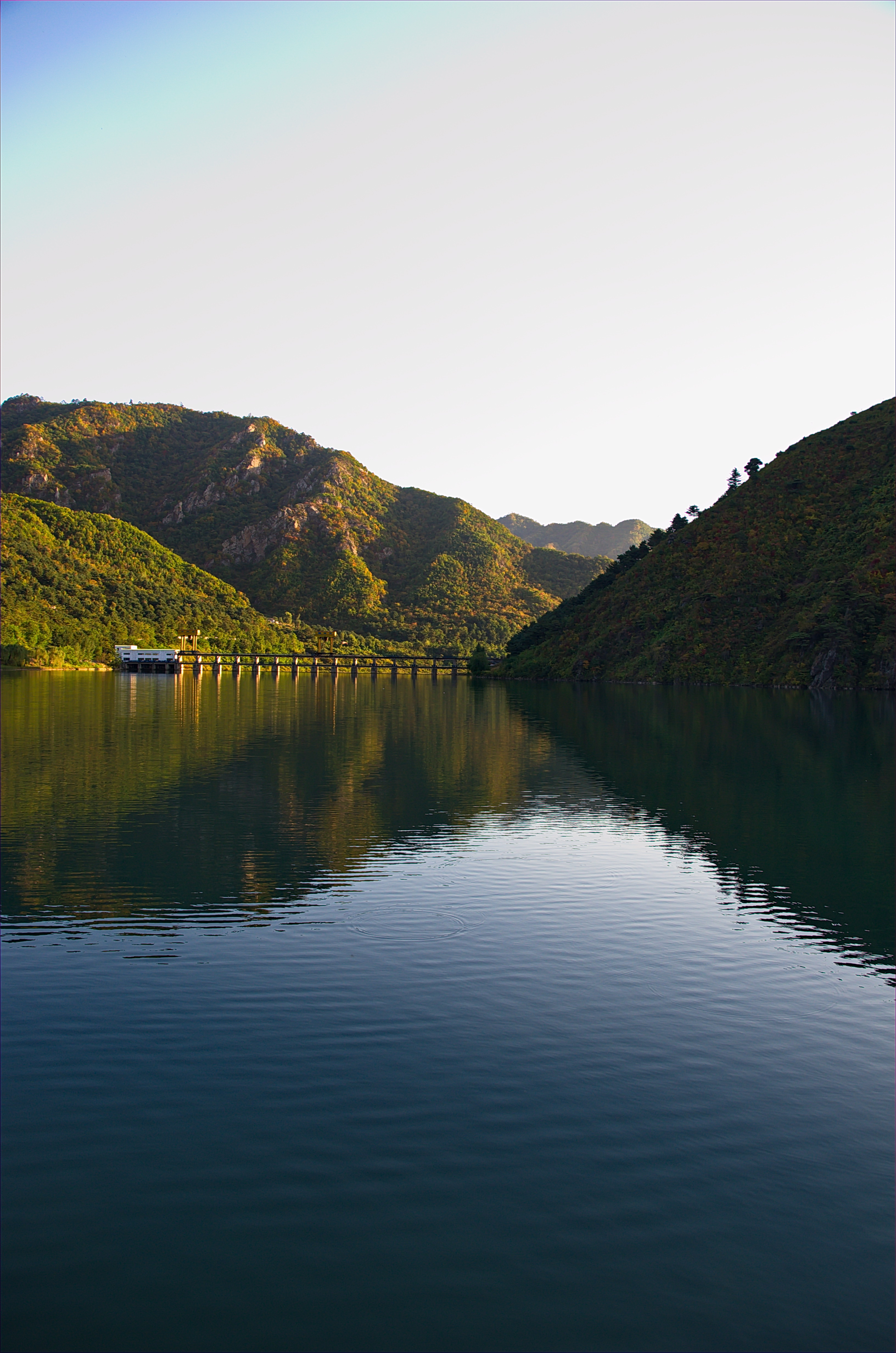
North Korean river

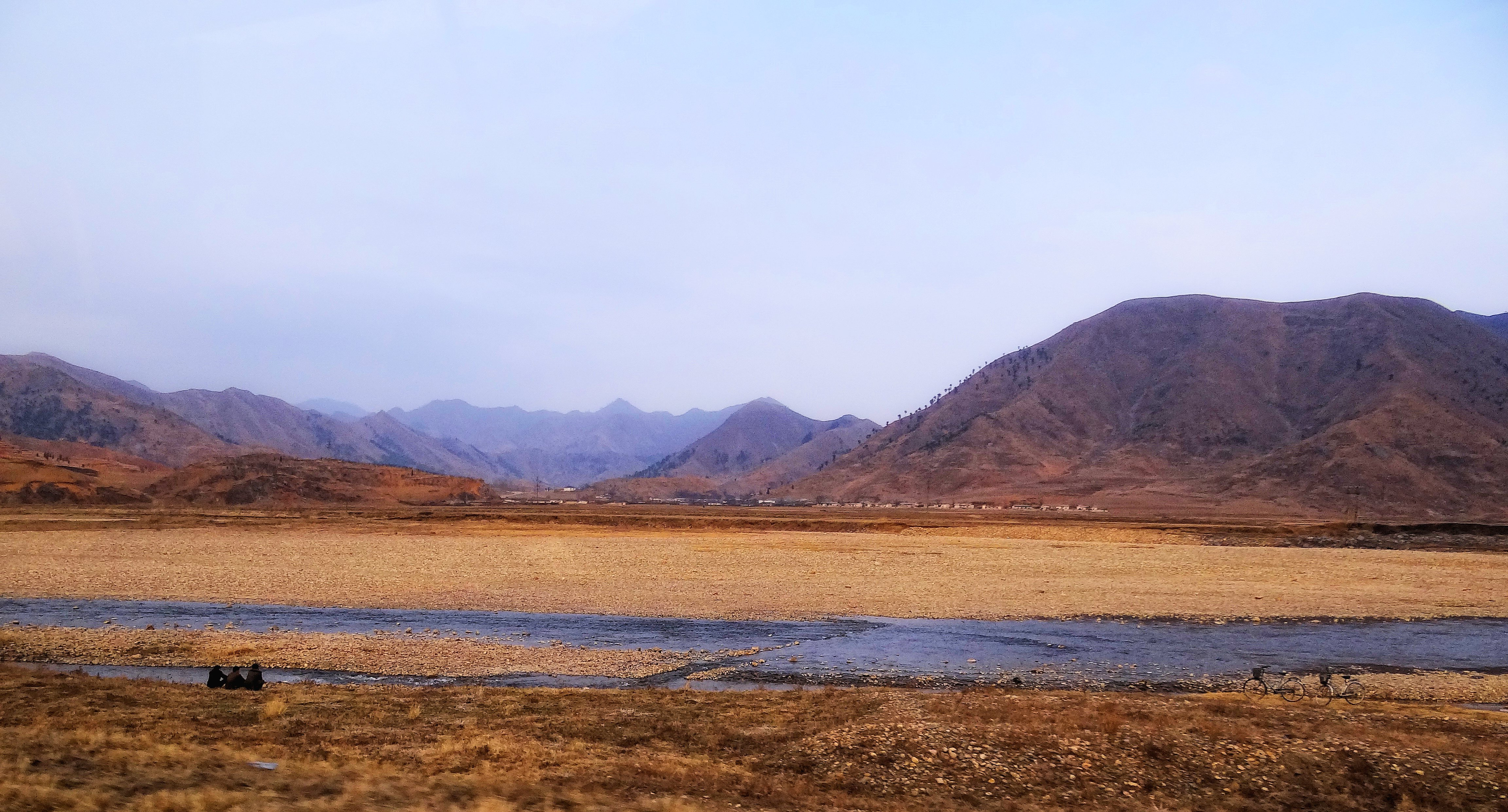
Hwanghae Province scenery

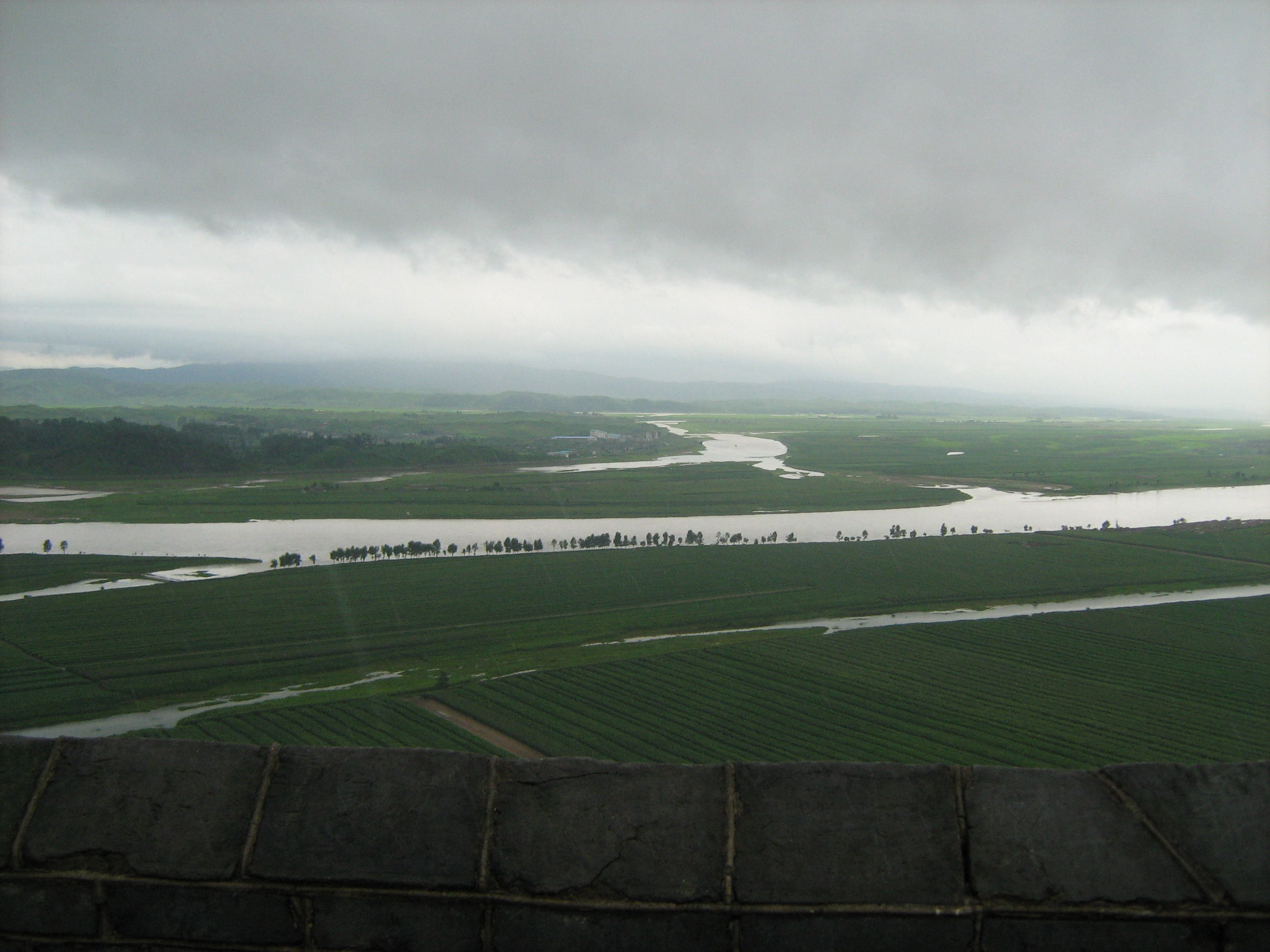
Yalu River Delta

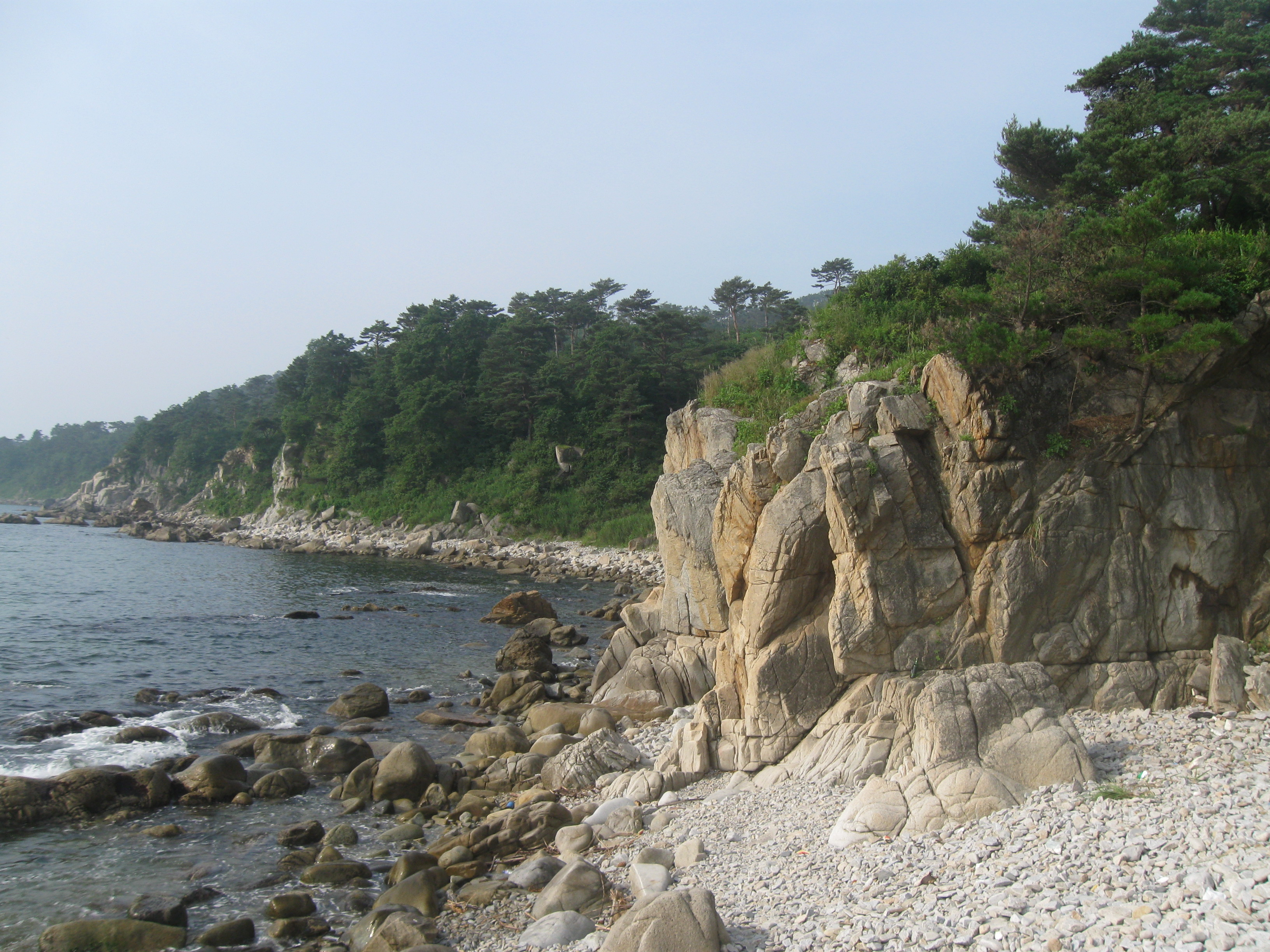
North Korean coastline

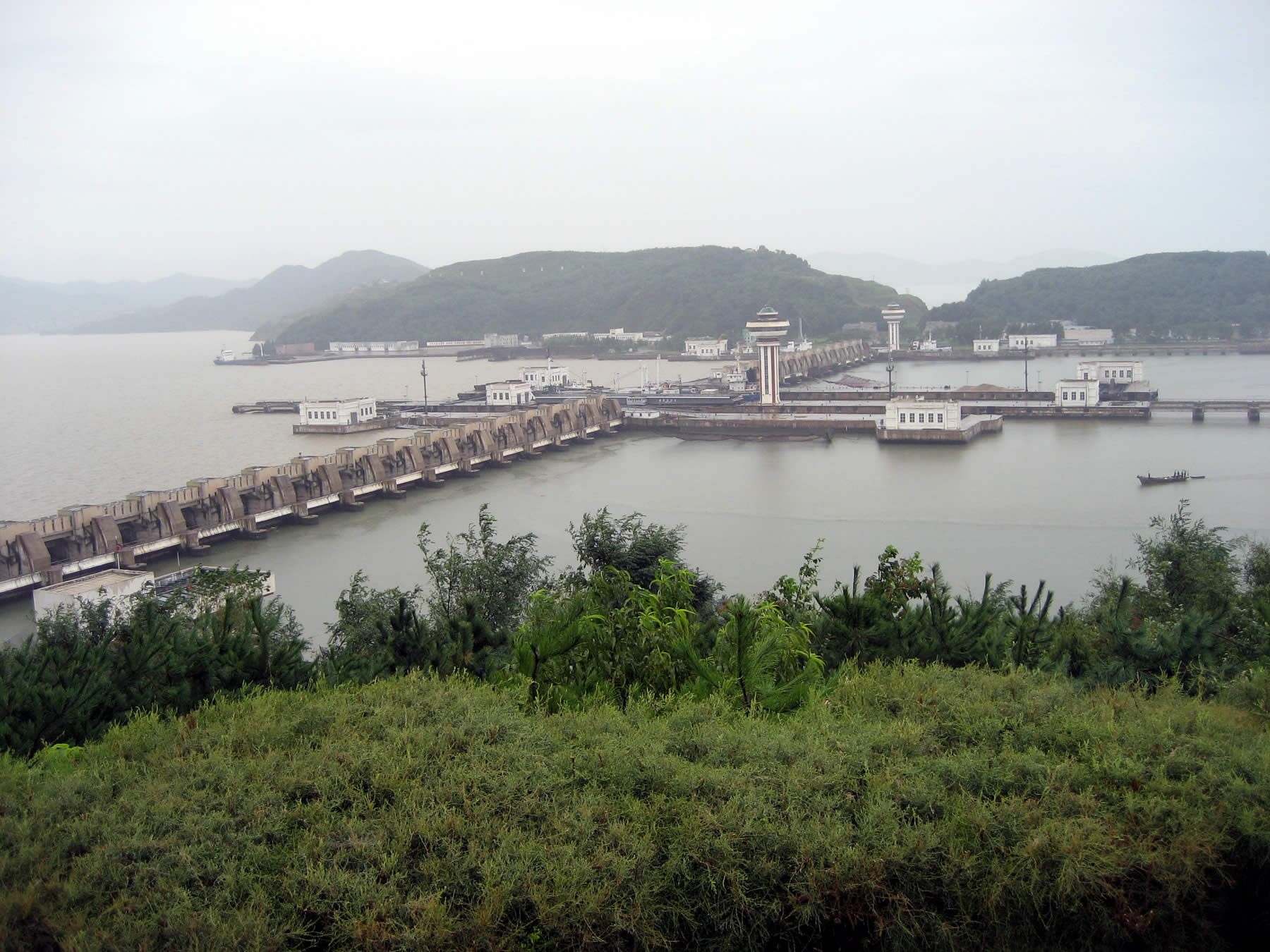
West Sea Barrage

== See also ==
- Geography of North Korea
- Environment of South Korea
