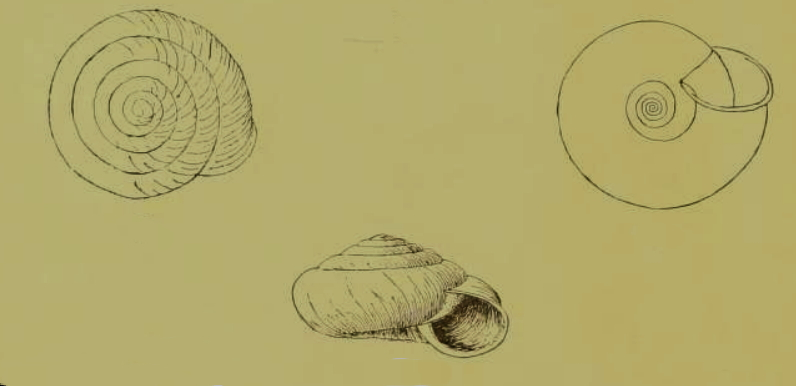
- Shell of Aegista chejuensis (holotype)

Scientific classification
- Kingdom: Animalia
- Phylum: Mollusca
- Class: Gastropoda
- Order: Stylommatophora
- Family: Camaenidae
- Subfamily: Bradybaeninae
- Tribe: Aegistini
- Genus: Aegista
- Species: A. chejuensis

Binomial name
- Aegista chejuensis (Pilsbry & Y. Hirase, 1908)

Synonyms
- Eulota (Aegista) chejuensis Pilsbry & Hirase, 1908 (original combination)

= Aegista chejuensis =

Species of gastropod

Aegista chejuensis is a species of air-breathing land snails, a terrestrial pulmonate gastropod in the family Camaenidae, and was first described in 1908 by Henry Augustus Pilsbry and Yoichirō Hirase as Eulota (Aegista) chejuensis.

== Description ==
The diameter of the shell attains 10.5 mm.

The shell bears a striking resemblance to Aegista mimula, adopting a similar shape. Its complexion is a subtle pale brown, adorned with a glossy finish, and etched with delicate, irregular growth lines. Upon closer inspection, faint spiral lines adorn the base, while the overall cuticle maintains a smooth texture. The shell contains 6 - 6 1/3 whorls. The aperture appears oblique, with a thin, expanded outer lip. The outer and basal margins delicately curl inward.

== Distribution ==
Species of the genus, Aegista, occur on Korean Peninsula and in Japan. However, this species is found only on the Korean Peninsula, in Jeollanam-do and on Jeju Island (in South Korea).
