= Flora of North Korea =

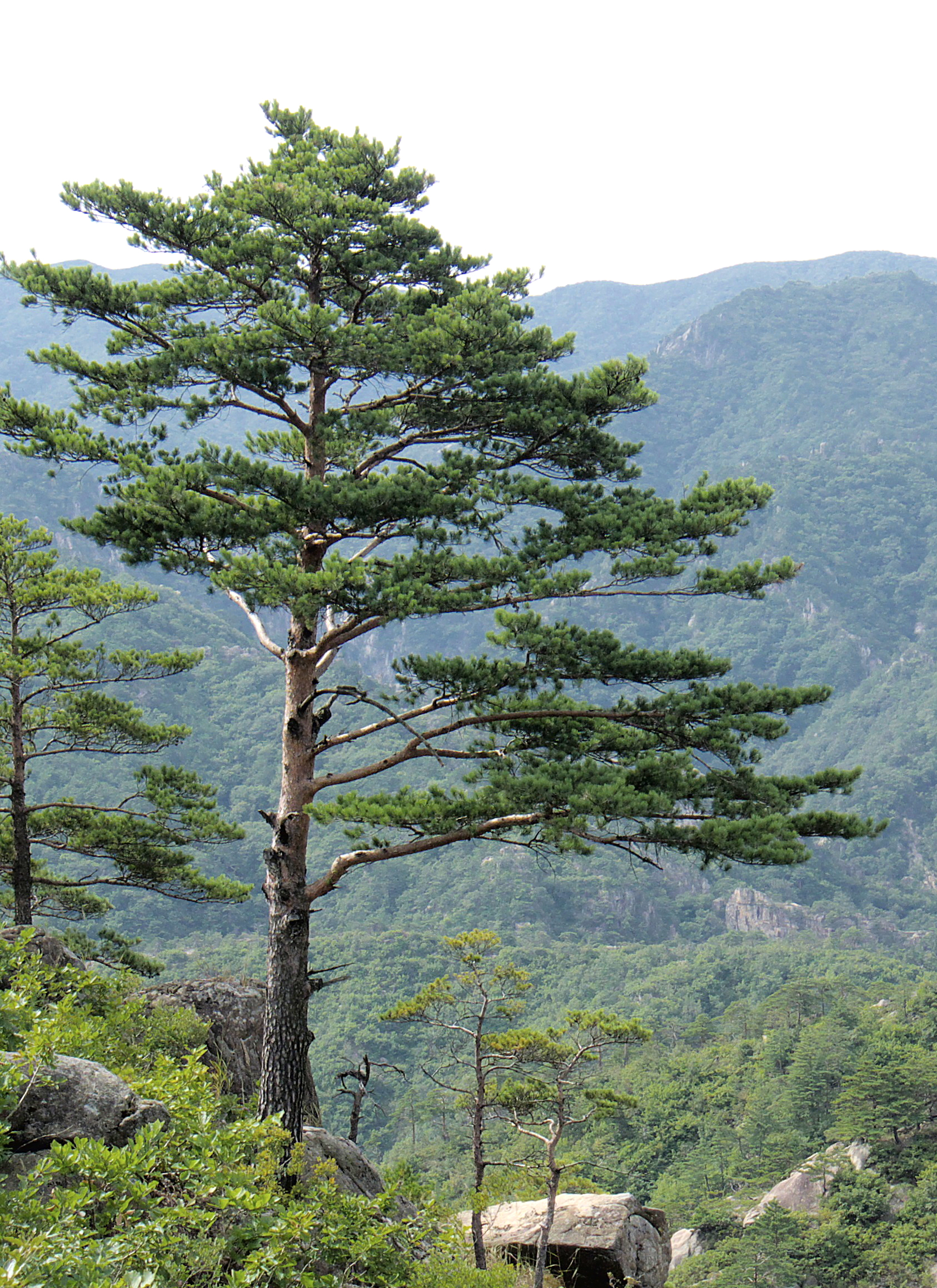
Pinus densiflora, a widespread tree in North Korea

The flora of North Korea has much in common with that of other areas of the northern hemisphere. 2898 species have been recorded, of which 14% are endemic. Four are classified as threatened.

The native plant communities in the lowlands have largely disappeared with cultivation and urbanisation, and the native conifer forest communities are located in the highlands.

The forest types are mainly subarctic (boreal) and cool-temperate forest.

Pinus densiflora dominates coniferous forests across North Korea, and has also increased in abundance in areas altered by human impact.

The main botanic garden in North Korea is the Central Botanical Garden, established in 1959. It is located at the base of Mount Taesong in Pyongyang.

Three endangered species are so distinctive they have been classified in their own monotypic genera. The endangered Pentactina rupicola of the family Rosaceae is found only near the summit of Mount Geumgang in Kangwon Province. The only member of its genus, its relationships have been unclear, though molecular testing suggests its closest relative is the North American genus Petrophytum. Abeliophyllum distichum is a critically endangered plant from the central Korean peninsula. It too belongs to a genus of which it is the sole member. From Korea it has been introduced to horticulture in England and North America, as well as being cultivated in North Korea. Sophora koreensis was also classified in its own genus, Echinosophora but has since been found to lie within the genus Sophora genetically.
