= Polypylis hemisphaerula =

Conservation status
- Least Concern (IUCN 3.1)

Scientific classification
- Kingdom: Animalia
- Phylum: Mollusca
- Class: Gastropoda
- Superorder: Hygrophila
- Family: Planorbidae
- Genus: Polypylis
- Species: P. hemisphaerula

Binomial name
- Polypylis hemisphaerula (Benson, 1842)

Synonyms
- Segmentina hemisphaerula (Benson, 1842); Planorbis hemisphaerula Benson, 1842; Helix dicaela Morelet, 1865; Planorbis dicaelus (Morelet, 1865); Planorbis demangei Bavay & Dautzenberg, 1910; Planorbis largillierti E. von Martens, 1867

Species of mollusc

Polypylis hemisphaerula is a species of gastropods belonging to the family Planorbidae.

The species is found in Japan and Southeastern Asia. It is reported to act as an intermediate host of medically important trematodes Fasciolopsis buski and Neodiplostomum seoulensis.
