= Wildlife of South Korea =

The wildlife of South Korea includes 8,271 plant species, 18,117 animal species and 3,528 species of fungi and others. 30,000 species are known to inhabit South Korea, among an estimated 100,000+ in all.

== Animalia ==
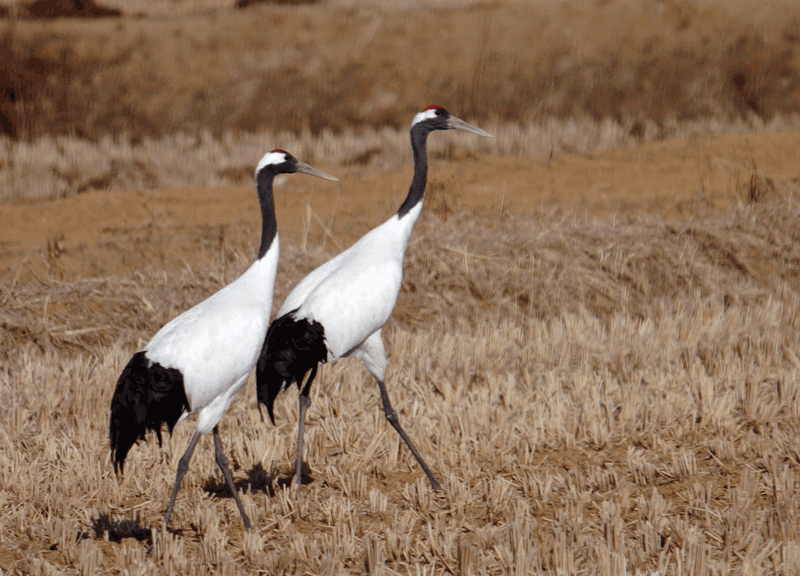
Red-crowned crane couple

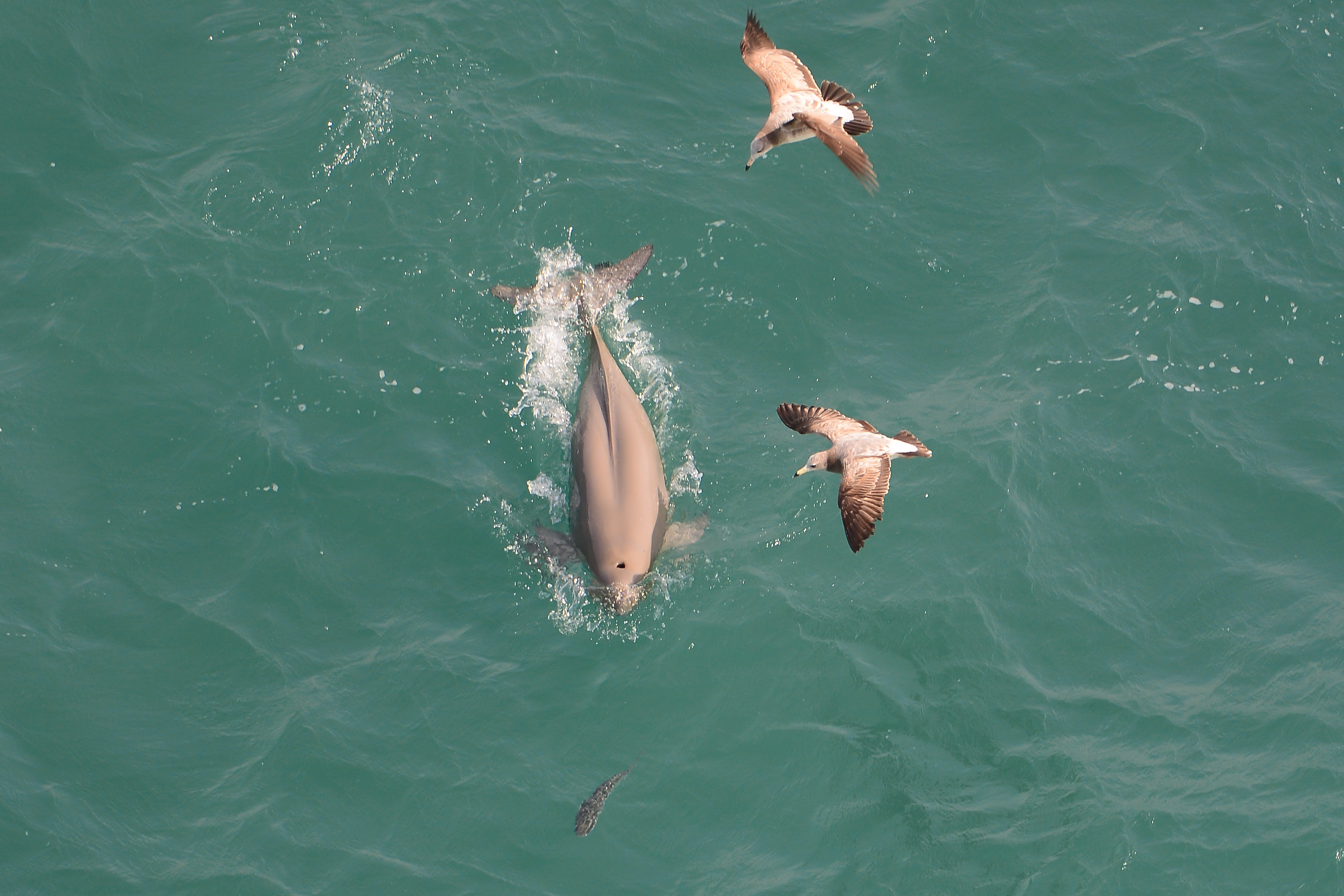
Finless porpoise in Namhae

South Korea has complex terrain and is surrounded by water on three sides. Therefore, South Korea has multiple climate zones and high precipitation, leading to diverse wildlife.

18,117 animal species include 1,528 species of vertebrates, 13,025 species of insects, and 3,564 species of other invertebrates.

=== Endangered wildlife ===
Article 2 of the Wildlife Conservation and Management Act discusses endangered wild animals. Among the 246 endangered species are many in need of urgent conservation measures. Endangered animals include:

- Amur leopard cat – the only wild cat. It lives primarily in mountainous regions.
- Red-crowned crane – lives along the Imjin River.
- Golden eagle – ranges across the country.
- Siberian musk deer – lives in Gangwon Province.
- Hodgson's bat
- Ussuri black bear
- Mongolian wolf – lives in North Gyeongsang Province, Gangwon Province and North Chungcheong Province, but is considered to be virtually extinct.

=== Harmful wild animals ===
Harmful wild animals are wild animals that damage property or endanger people.

Harmful wild animals include:

- Sparrow, magpie, jay, crow, and brown-eared bulbul, which damage fruit crops.
- Pigeon, pheasant, water deer, mole, red squirrel, and some kinds of rat and duck damage agriculture, forests and fisheries given their high population densities.
- Magpie damages power facilities such as utility poles.
- Pigeon damages residences with their feces and feathers.
- Wild boars roam the mountainsides, but have begun coming to cities centers in search of food. These big, strong, and fast animals can potentially be fatal to humans.
- Asian giant hornets, in swarms, can destroy an entire hive of honey bees. They usually live in large trees and have been known to attack people who accidentally run into their nests.

== Flora ==
South Korea hosts 8,271 species of plants, consisting of 4,662 vascular species and 3,609 non-vascular species. Wild plants include species native to Korea such as Pentactina. Ecosystems are unstable because of land development. 67 km^{2} of forest disappear each year, accounting for 0.1% of South Korean forests.

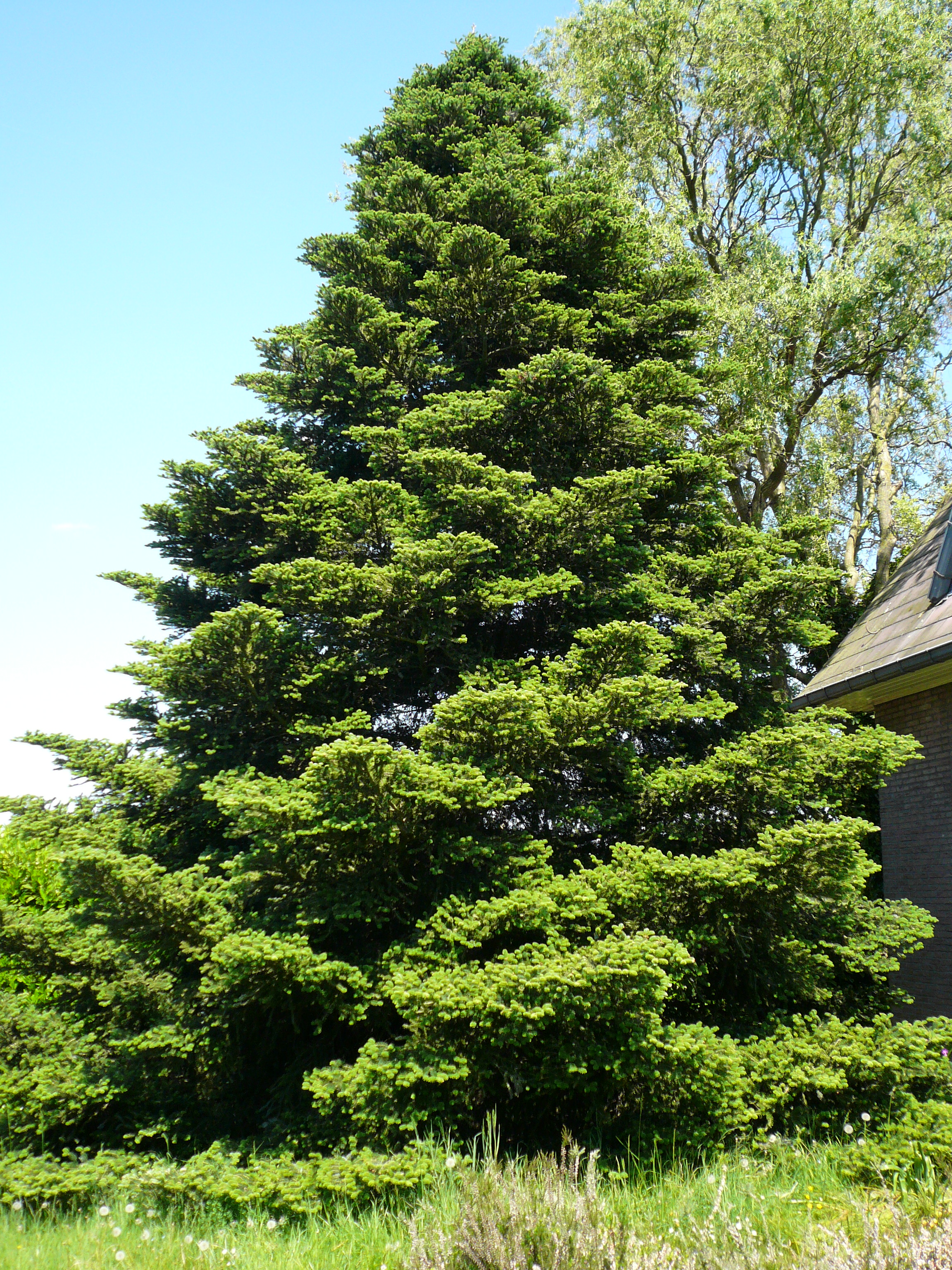
Abies koreana

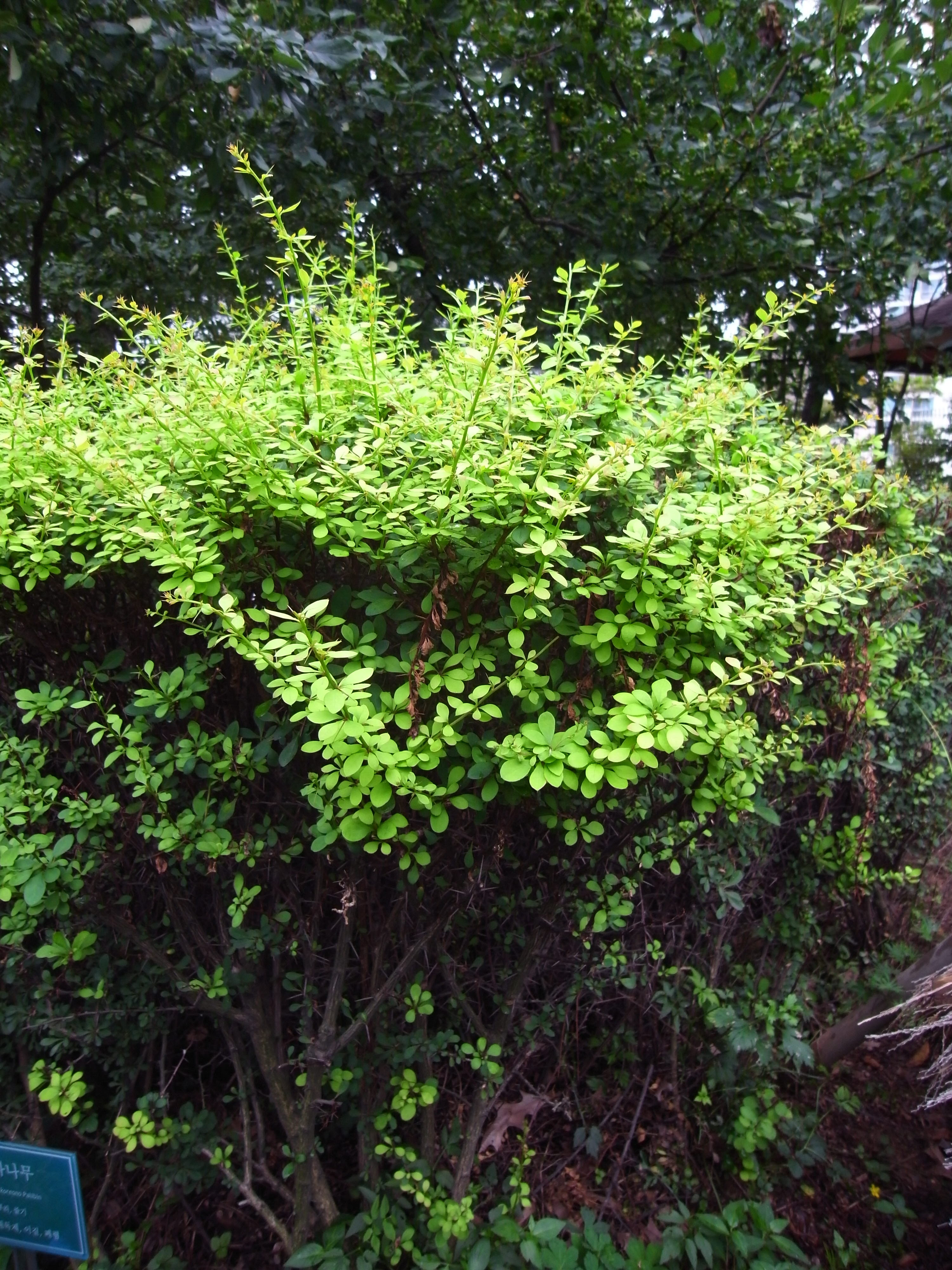
Berberis koreana

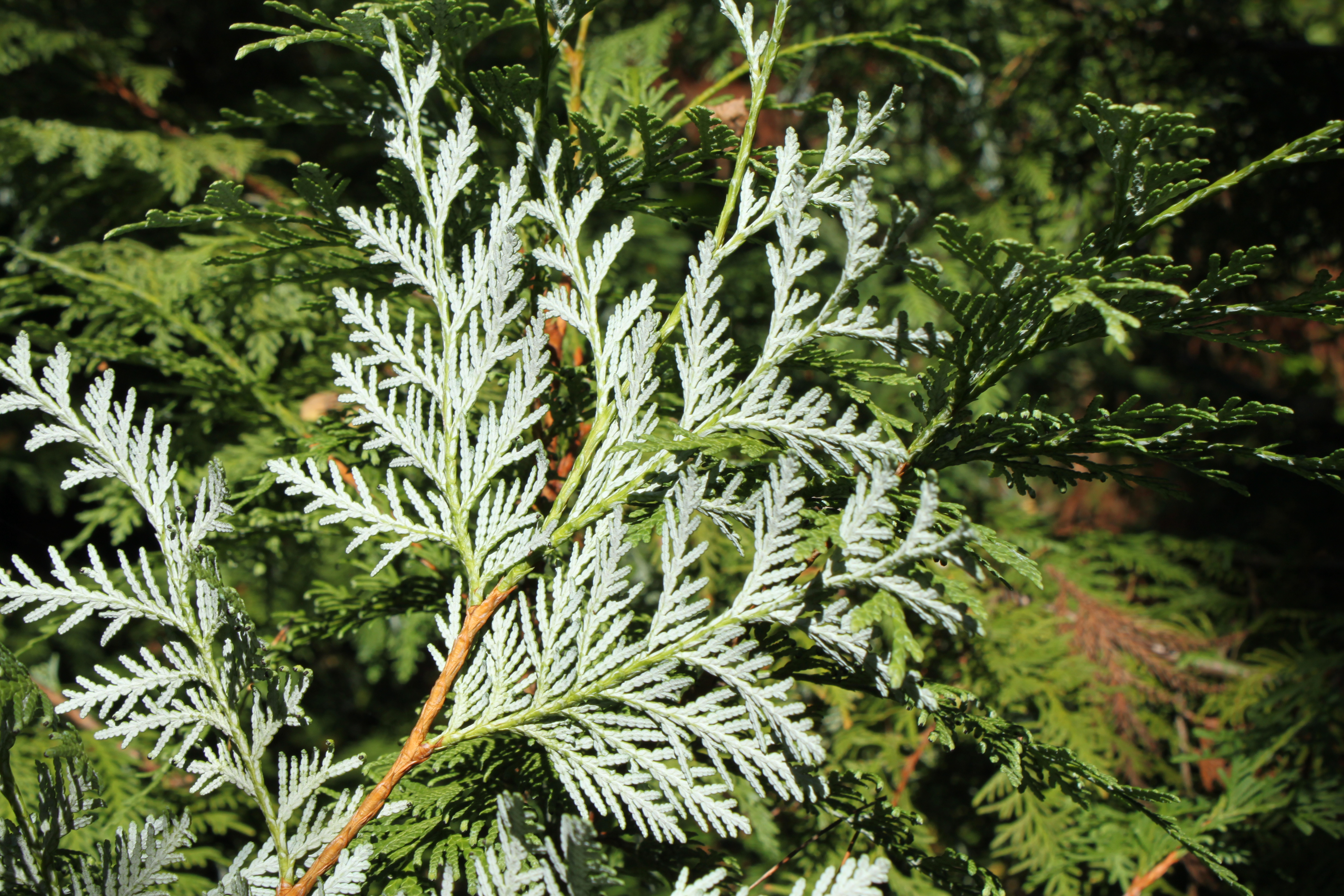
Thuja koraiensis

=== Distribution ===
Korea can be divided into three biozones by plant distribution: warm-temperate forest, temperate forest and subalpine forest. Evergreen broad-leaved trees grow in warm-temperate forests. Warm-temperate forests include the southern coastal region, Jeju Island and several islands of the southern sea which are below 35°N.

==== Warm-temperate forest ====
Species include Quercus myrsinaefolia, Quercus acuta, Quercus salicina, Daphniphyllum macropodum, Castanopsis cuspidata, Ligustrum foliosum nakai, Machilus thunbergii.

Ulleungdo: A sort of tree that reseeds with Mt. Seonginbong as a center at approximately 600 m altitude. Altitudes below 600 m have wild plants in the Southern province such as magnolia, Euonymus japonicus, Camellia japonica, Hedera rhombea, Ardisia japonica, Vitex rotundifolia and others. Above 600 m Fagus crenata and Sorbus commixta can be found.

Jejudo can be divided into coast and mountain. Coast vegetation consists of Sinomenium acutum, Machilus thunbergii, Daphniphyllum macropodum, Camellia japonica, Vitex rotundifolia, Centella asiatica. Reynoutria elliptica, Hydrangea serrata, Eleutherococcus senticosus, Aconitum napiforme, Schisandra repanda and others.

==== Temperate forest ====
Temperate forests dominate South Korea, occupying 85% of its territory, including land between the Korean Demilitarized Zone and the northern part of 35°N. Common species are Carpinus laxiflora, Carpinus tschonoskii and Quercus mongolica.

Temperate forest
Region	Species
Kaema Plateau	Picea jezoensis Pinus pumila Abies nephrolepis Larix gmelinii Abies holophylla
37°N at the west coast, 38°N at the east coast and interior around 36.5°	Common bamboo Acer palmatum Carpinus laxiflora
Jirisan mountain	Hemerocallis fulva Picea jezoensis Cornus officinalis Rhododendron mucronulatum Abies koreana Eleutherococcus senticosus Aconitum chiisanense Angelica gigas
Mt. Deogyusan	Aconitum uchiyamai Sorbus commixta Acanthopanax sessiliflorus Cimicifuga simplex
Coast district	Camellia japonica Euonymus japonicus Daphniphyllum macropodum Camellia sinensis
Central part of temperate forest: 39°N at the west coast 40°N at the east coast. Interior temperate forest: 38° boundary line (38th parallel north) and Northern Limit Line of south temperate forest	Quercus dentatomongolica Acer pictum subsp. mono Betula costata Zanthoxylum planispinum
Seoraksan Mountain	Hemerocallis dumortieri Ampelopsis brevipedunculata Rhododendron brachycarpum Rhododendron fauriae
Odaesan Mountain	Astilbe chinensis Berberis koreana lily of the valley
Chiaksan Mountain	Codonopsis lanceolata Lactuca indica Hieracium umbellatum Aconitum
Mt.Taebaeksan	Juniperus chinensis Taxus cuspidata Juniperus rigida Pinus densiflora Viola diamantica Nakai; Trientalis europaea Arisaema erubescens
Cheonmasan Mountain	Juniperus chinensis Taxus cuspidata Juniperus rigida Draba nemorosa L. Eranthis stellata Maxim; Hepatica asiatica Nakai; Adonis amurensis Heloniopsis koreana
Mt.Sobaeksan	Iris rossii Hylomecon
Woraksan Mountain	Actinidia arguta Thymus quinquecostatus Rubus coreanus
Mt.Songnisan	Leonurus japonicus Angelica gigas
Juwangsan mountain	Staphylea pinnata Jeffersonia; Fraxinus rhynchophylla Rhododendron schlippenbachii
West coast islands	Machilus thunbergii Camellia japonica Epimedium koreanum Scopolia japonica Berberis koreana Valeriana fauriei Cornus officinalis Schisandra chinensis
Northern part of the temperate forest between a north limit of central temperate forest and boundary line(38th parallel north)	Betula platyphylla Pinus koraiensis Acer komarovii Ligularia fischeri Rhododendron aureum Epimedium koreanum rhubarb Viola mandshurica Lithospermum erythrorhizon

==== Subalpine forest ====
South Korea lowlands have no boreal forests. However subalpine coniferous forest is found in highland or mountainous districts. Part of Hallasan, part of Seoraksan, fir forest of Jirisan and Gotjawal Forest in Jeju Province are the subalpine forests. At 1200 m–1500 m altitude in Hallasan, a coniferous forest consists of pine, juniper, and a Korean fir. Fruticeta is formed in 1500 m–1700 m and the alpine zone spread out above 1850 m. South-facing slopes have more mild weather than north-facing slopes. Therefore, its height extends a little more on the south side.

=== Endangered plants ===
Endangered plants are divided into first and second grades. Species are selected by the Environment Minister after a consultation with the Minister of Central Administration.

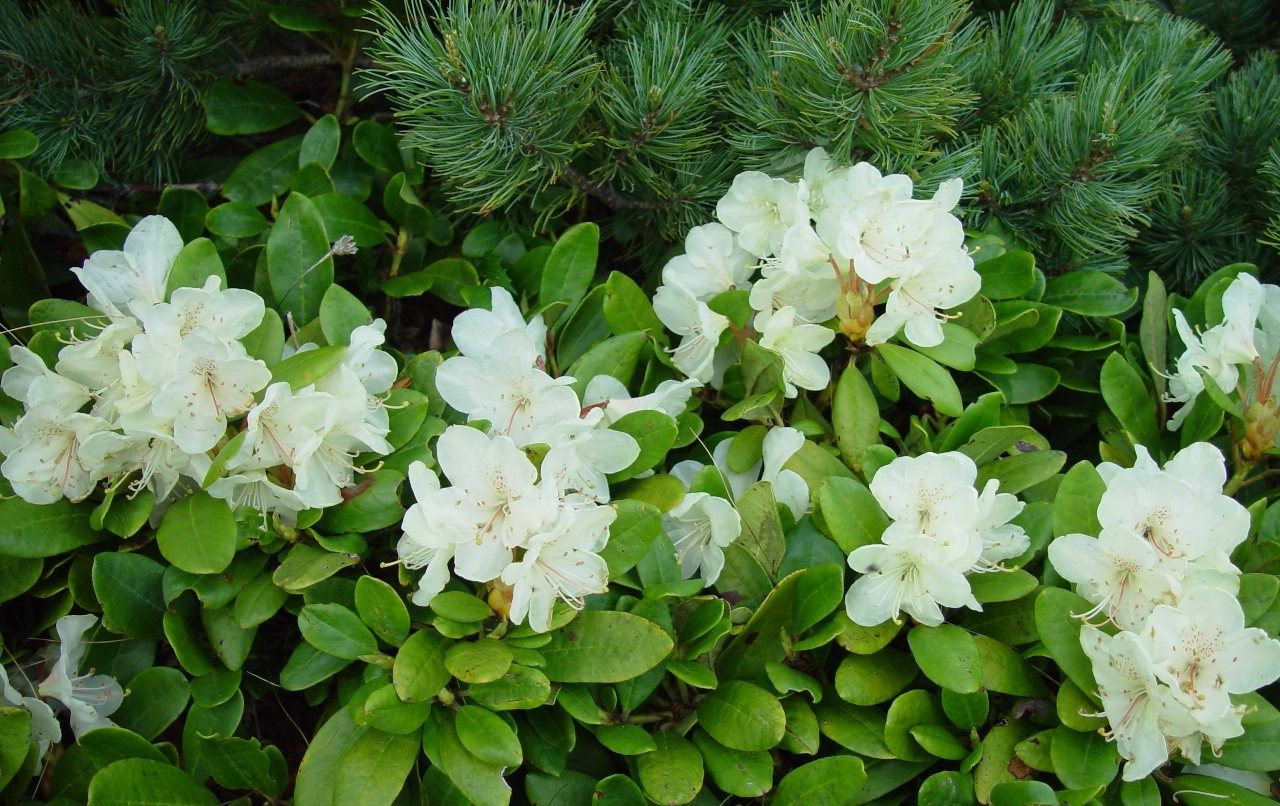
Rhododendron aureum

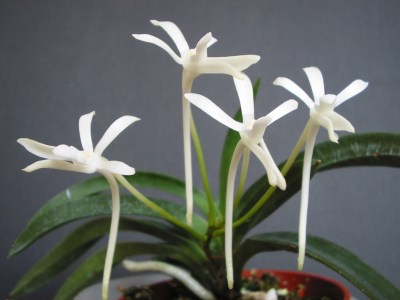
Neofinetia falcata

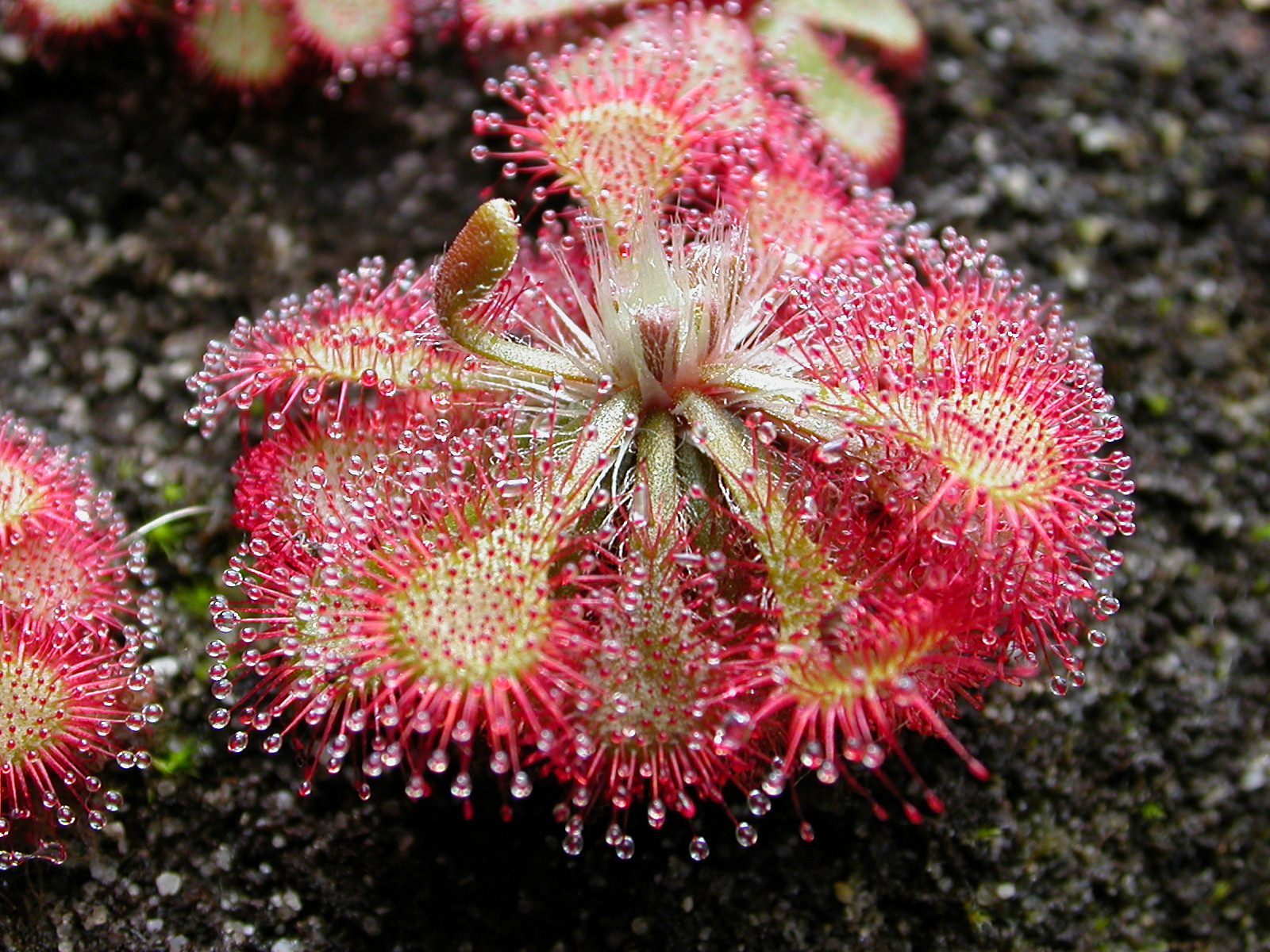
Sundew

First grade endangered wild plants species have populations significantly reduced by natural causes or artificial factors. First grade endangered wild plants include:

- Malus komarovii (이노리나무): This plant is also found in China. It reaches 5m in height. It grows deep in the mountain.
- Cypripedium japonicum ((광릉요강꽃(광릉복주머니란) 난초과)): It can found in Namyangju, Gyeonggi Province.
- Aerides japonicum Reichb. fil (나도풍란 난초과): It can be found in Jeju Province or South Jeolla Province, Koreas' warmest region. It has an aerial root. The length of the leaves is 8 cm~15 .
- Euchresta japonica Hook. f. (만년콩 콩과): It grows in valleys in Jeju Province.
- Diapensia lapponica L. (암매(돌매화나무) 암매과): It is found in Mt. Hallasan in Jeju Province.
- Cymbidium lancifolium (죽백란 난초과): It can be found in Mt. Hallasan in Jeju Province.
- Neofinetia falcata (풍란 난초과): It is found in the southern island and Japan.
- Cymbidium kanran (한란 난초과): It grows in the southern Jeju Province.

Second grade endangered wild plants are also significantly reduced by natural causes or artificial factors. These plants may become extinct in the foreseeable future.

- Euryale ferox (가시연꽃 수련과): It can be found in Gyeonggi Province and Gangwon Province, but water pollution has caused a crisis of extinction. It grows in ponds or swamps.
- Siberian ginseng (가시오갈피나무 두릅나무과): It is found in Gyeonggi, Gangwon, and North Gyeongsang Province. It grows in high mountain forests.
- Plagiorhegma dubium (Jeffersonia dubia) (깽깽이풀 매자나무과): It is an ornamental plant whose root is used in herbal medicine.
- Sundew (끈끈이귀개): It grows on beaches in the South Jeolla Province.
- Rhododendron aureum (노랑만병초): It grows in alpine region.
- Iris odaesanensis Y. N. Lee (노랑무늬붓꽃): An endemic species, it grows in the South Gyeongsang Province mountains such as Odaesan and Taebaeksan.
- Aster altaicus var. uchiyamae (단양쑥부쟁이): It can be found in Yeoju, Gyeonggi Province, and Danyang County, North Chungcheong Province.
- Ranunculus kazusensis (매화마름): It lives in the southern province and west coast.
- Isoetes (물부추): It grows in shallow water. It was found in Pyeongtaek in 1942; it went extinct in Korea but grows in Japan.
- Vexillabium yakushimense (Yamamoto) F. Maekawa (백운란): It grows in mountains and forests in South Jeolla Province and North Jeolla Province.
- Saururus chinensis (삼백초): It grows in well ventilated valleys, in Jeju Province and Mt.Jirisan.
- Viola raddeana Regel (선제비꽃): It grows in a brook in South Gyeongsang Province and Gyeonggi Province.
- Lilium cernuum Kom (솔나리): It grows in mountainous regions.
- Psilotum nudum (솔잎란): It grows on the coast in the southern part of Jeju Province.
- Wisteriopsis japonica (Sieb. et Zucc.) A. Gray (syn. Millettia japonica) (애기등): It grows in South Jeolla Province and South Gyeongsang Province.
- Viola websteri Hemsl. (왕제비꽃): It grows in areas that have a lot of moisture. It flowers white in April or May. It grows to 40 ~ 90 cm. It is found in Gapyeong County in Gyeonggi, Sambang County in South Hamgyong Province (North Korea), and Paektu Mountain (North Korea). It is endemic.
- Cyrtosia septentrionalis (으름난초): Called 'Gaecheon-ma', it grows in forests in Jeju Province.
- Polygonatum stenophyllum Maxim (층층둥굴레): It grows in mountains and pastures.
- Mankyua chejuense (제주고사리삼): Endemic to Jeju Province.
- Leontice microrhyncha S. Moore (한계령풀): It grows to 30 ~ 40 cm. It is found in penumbra or fertile region in high mountain. It has three leaves. It flowers in July and August. It is used as an ornamental plant.

== Demilitarized Zone ==
The Demilitarized Zone (DMZ) is the unmanned strip of land that separates North and South Korea. Since the Armistice that ended combat in 1953, its ecosystem has reverted to its natural state due to the absence of human activity. The DMZ and Civilian Control Zone (CCZ) (a buffer to the DMZ) support many rivers and abundant diverse ecosystems hosting plant, mammal, fish and bird species, many of which are globally endangered.

Over 5,000 species of plants and animals have been identified as living in the DMZ, including many on the endangered species list. These include: Siberian musk deer, white-naped crane, red-crowned crane, Asiatic black bear, cinereous vulture and the long-tailed goral.

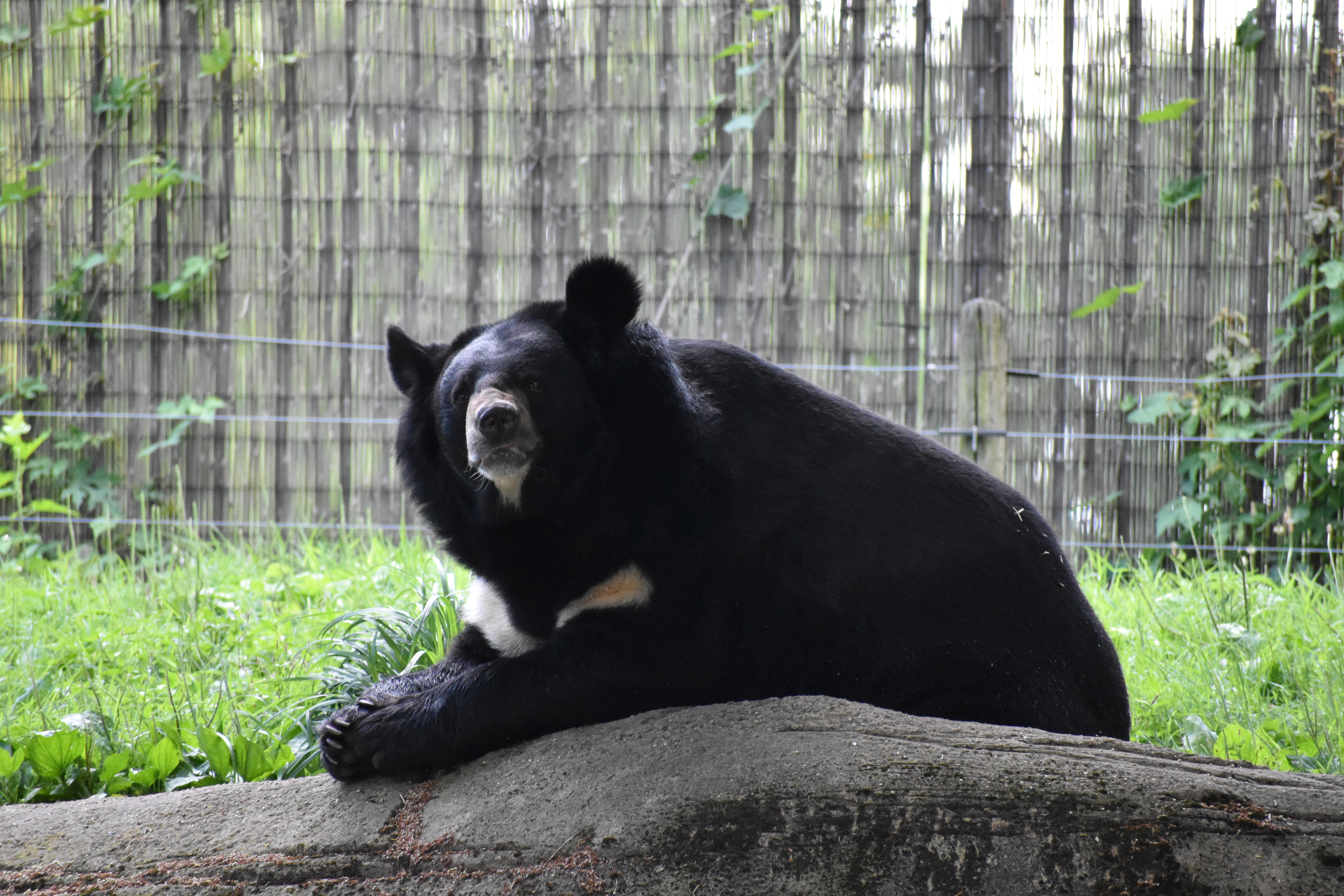
Asiatic black bear in captivity

=== Preserving biodiversity ===
DMZ and the CCZ are bordered by land mines that prevent human activities. It is part of the East Asia flyway system of birds migrating from Russia to Australia. The white-naped crane and red-crowned crane populations are most affected.

This area is home to many other endangered animal species, including the Asian black bear, which is rated threatened on the endangered species list due to people harvesting their stomach bile and using it for Chinese herbology.

The South Korean Ministry of Environment works to keep the DMZ untouched by people to safeguard biodiversity.

== Controversies ==
The Han River ecosystem is endangered because the water flow changed due to water blocking construction at Ilsan Bridge. Deposition of materials in the river caused environmental damage. The Korean Association for the Protection of Wild Birds pushed to remove the structure, which possibly destroyed the natural ecology and caused the bank to overflow.

== Media ==
The Nakdong River Basin Environmental Office set up an unmanned camera and successfully captured images of wildlife. Wild animals are shown moving around the alpine wetlands and displayed actions such as hunting and territory marking. Martens were rated endangered as apex predators. This footage is the first to document local wildlife in real time. In addition, it offers scientists and government officials the opportunity to address preservation of the alpine climate.

== See also ==
- Environment of South Korea
- Wildlife of Korea
