= Paeonol =

Names
- Preferred IUPAC name 1-(2-Hydroxy-4-methoxyphenyl)ethan-1-one
- Other names 2'-Hydroxy-4'-methoxyacetophenone

Identifiers
CAS Number	552-41-0
3D model (JSmol)	Interactive image
ChemSpider	10621
ECHA InfoCard	100.008.194
PubChem CID	11092
UNII	3R834EPI82
CompTox Dashboard (EPA)	DTXSID1022059
- InChI: InChI=1S/C9H10O3/c1-6(10)8-4-3-7(12-2)5-9(8)11/h3-5,11H,1-2H3 Key: UILPJVPSNHJFIK-UHFFFAOYSA-N; InChI=1/C9H10O3/c1-6(10)8-4-3-7(12-2)5-9(8)11/h3-5,11H,1-2H3 Key: UILPJVPSNHJFIK-UHFFFAOYAG
- SMILES: CC(=O)C1=C(C=C(C=C1)OC)O

Properties
Chemical formula	C_{9}H_{10}O_{3}
Molar mass	166.176 g·mol^{−1}
- Except where otherwise noted, data are given for materials in their standard state (at 25 °C [77 °F], 100 kPa). Infobox references

Paeonol is a phenolic compound found in peonies such as Paeonia suffruticosa (moutan cortex), in Arisaema erubescens, and in Dioscorea japonica. It is a chemical compound found in some traditional Chinese medicines.

== Biological effects ==
A number of biological effects of paeonol in vitro or in animal models have been observed. Paeonol increases levels of cortical cytochrome oxidase and vascular actin and improves behavior in a rat model of Alzheimer's disease. Paeonol also reduced cerebral infarction involving the superoxide anion and microglia activation in ischemia-reperfusion injured rats.

Paeonol shows antimutagenic activities. It also has anti-inflammatory and analgesic effects in carrageenan-evoked thermal hyperalgesia. Paeonol inhibits anaphylactic reaction by regulating histamine and TNF-α.

Paeonol has weak MAO-A and MAO-B inhibiting effects with IC_{50} values of 54.6 μM and 42.5 μM respectively.

== Metal complex ==
Metal complexes of paeonol shows tetrahedral and octahedral coordination geometry in the absence and presence of solvent pyridine respectively.
