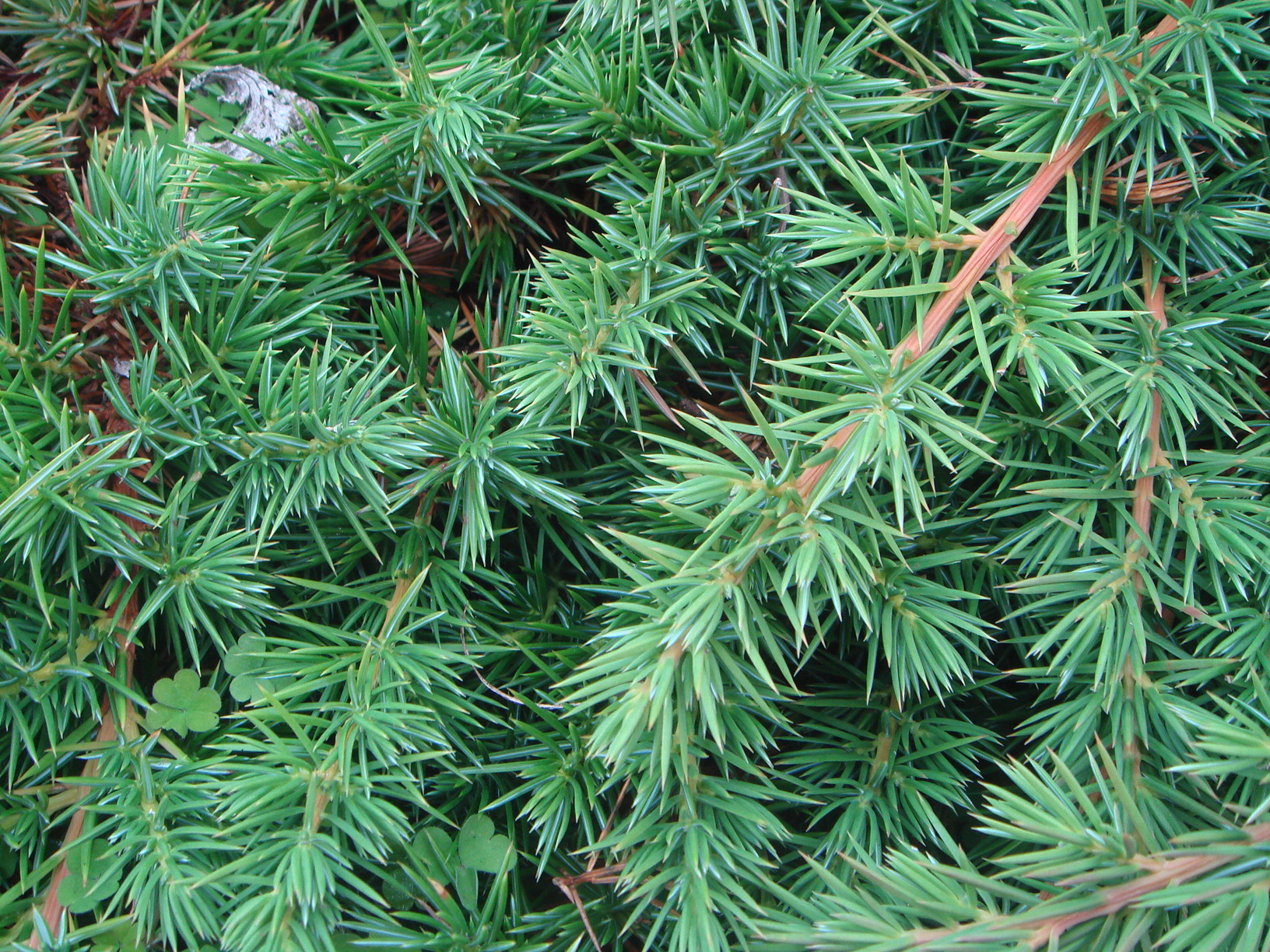

Scientific classification
- Kingdom: Plantae
- Clade: Tracheophytes
- Clade: Gymnospermae
- Division: Pinophyta
- Class: Pinopsida
- Order: Cupressales
- Family: Cupressaceae
- Genus: Juniperus
- Section: Juniperus sect. Juniperus
- Species: J. conferta

Binomial name
- Juniperus conferta Parl.

= Juniperus conferta =

Species of conifer

Juniperus conferta (shore juniper and blue pacific juniper) is a species of juniper, native to Japan, where it grows on sand dunes. It is often treated as a variety or subspecies of Juniperus rigida.

== Description ==
It forms a cover with a fresh yellowish-green color reminiscent of lawn. The foliage is prickly, typical of many junipers. The plant can tolerate acidic and alkaline soils but requires good drainage. Like other junipers it is tolerant of herbicides such as glyphosate.

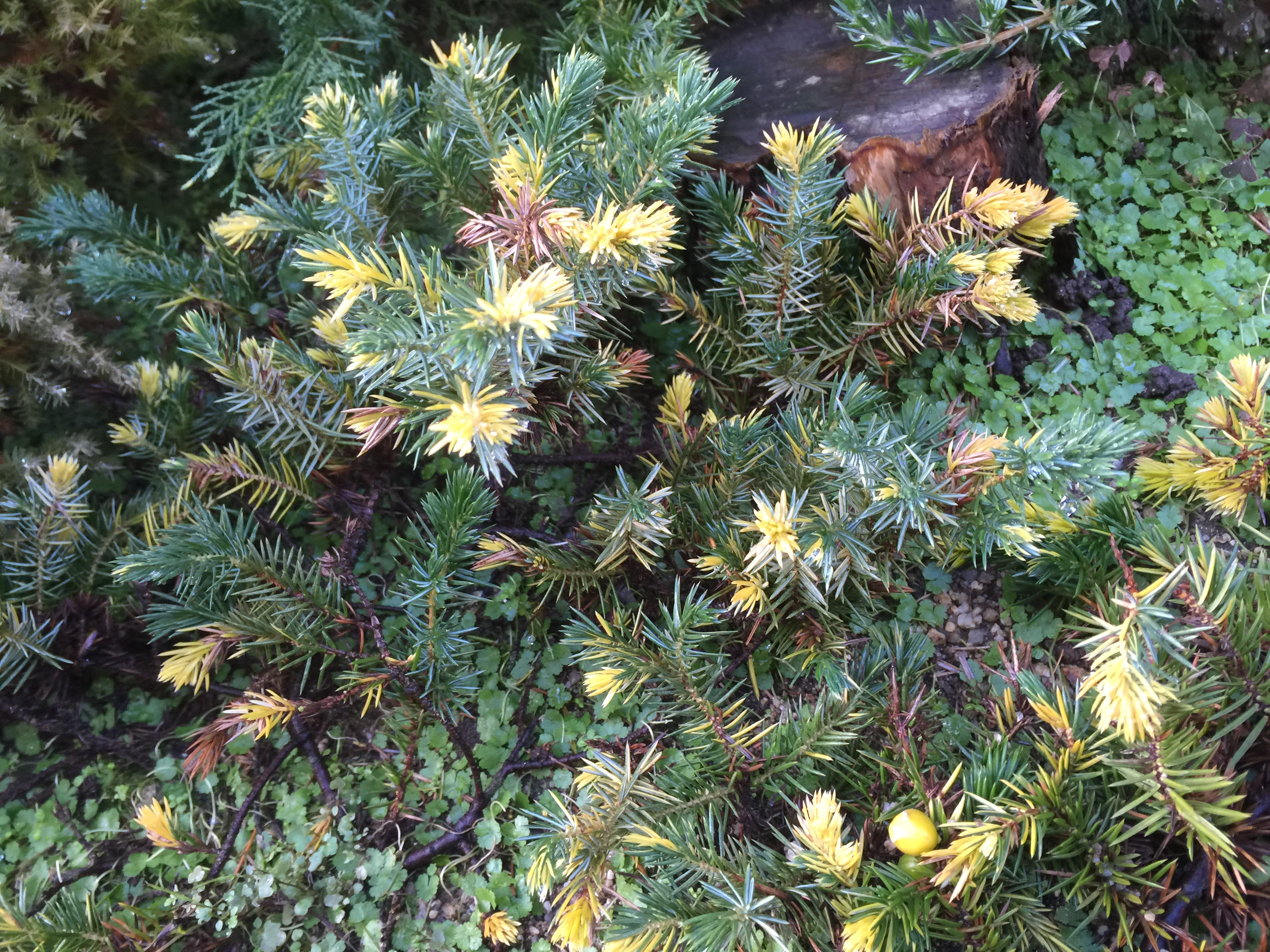
Cultivar 'Sunsplash'

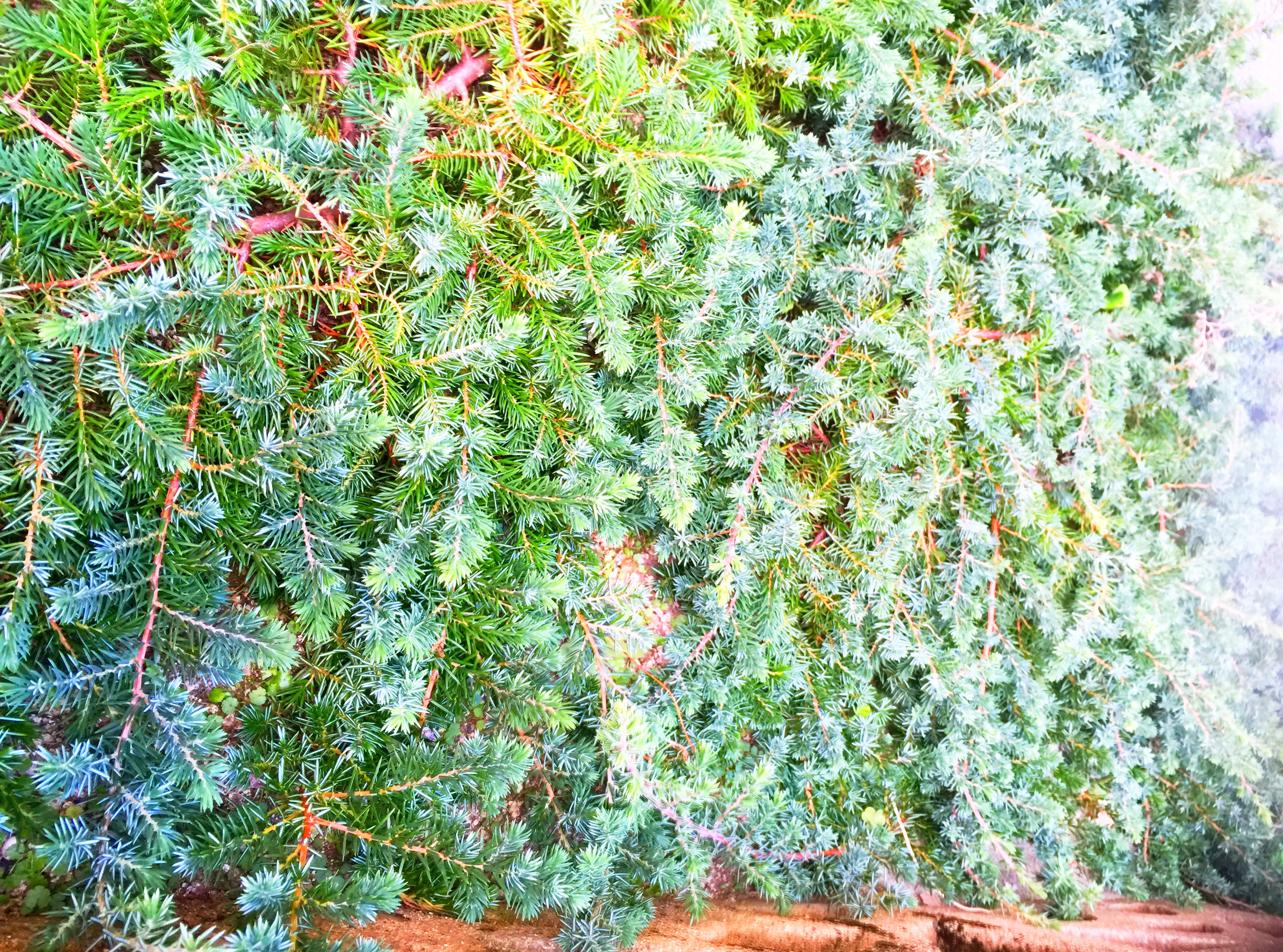
Cultivar 'Blue Pacific'

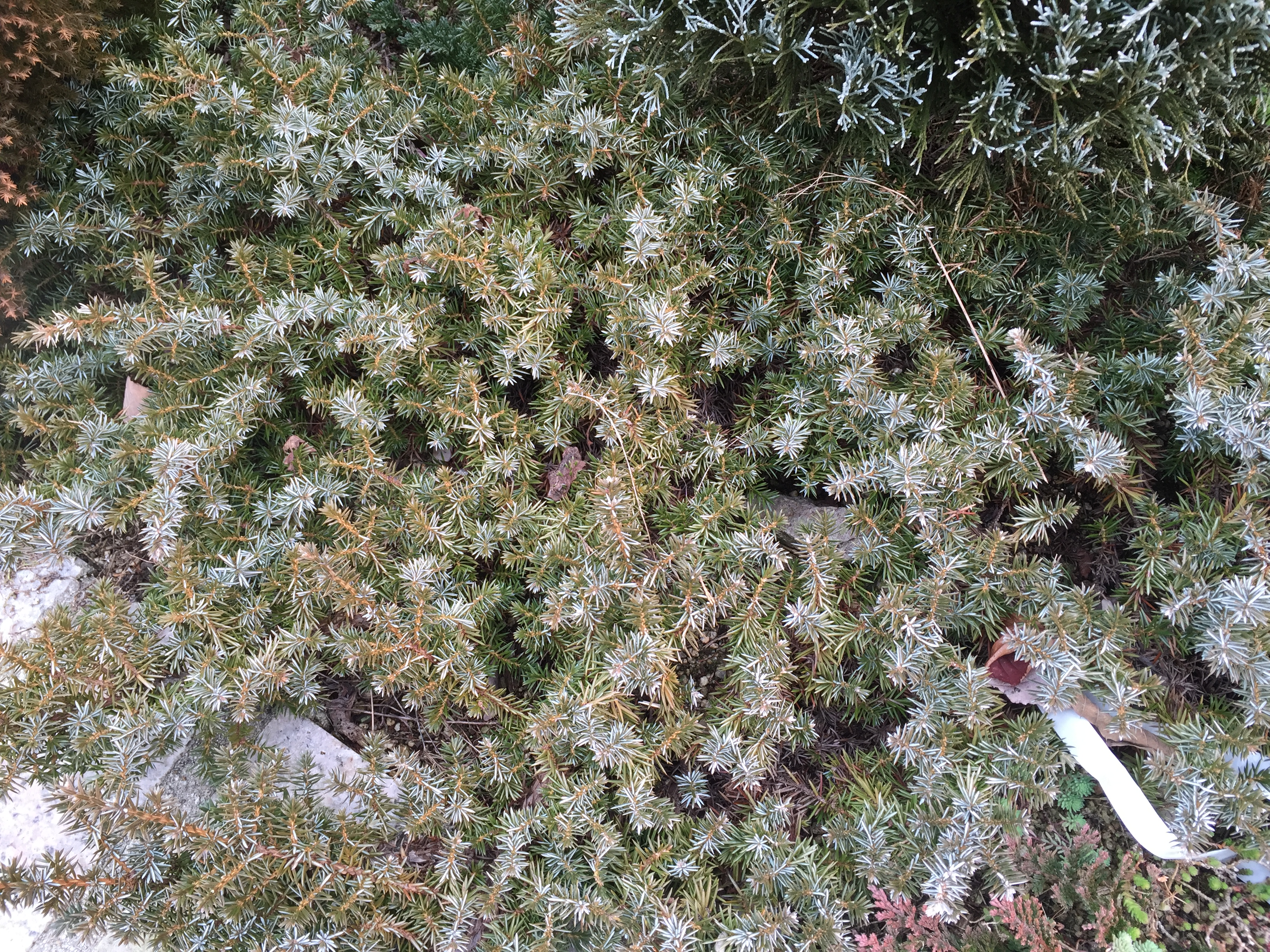
Cultivar 'Silver Mist'

== Etymology ==
Conferta is derived from Latin confertus -a -um, “pressed together, dense”.

== Uses ==
It is also often grown as bonsai.
