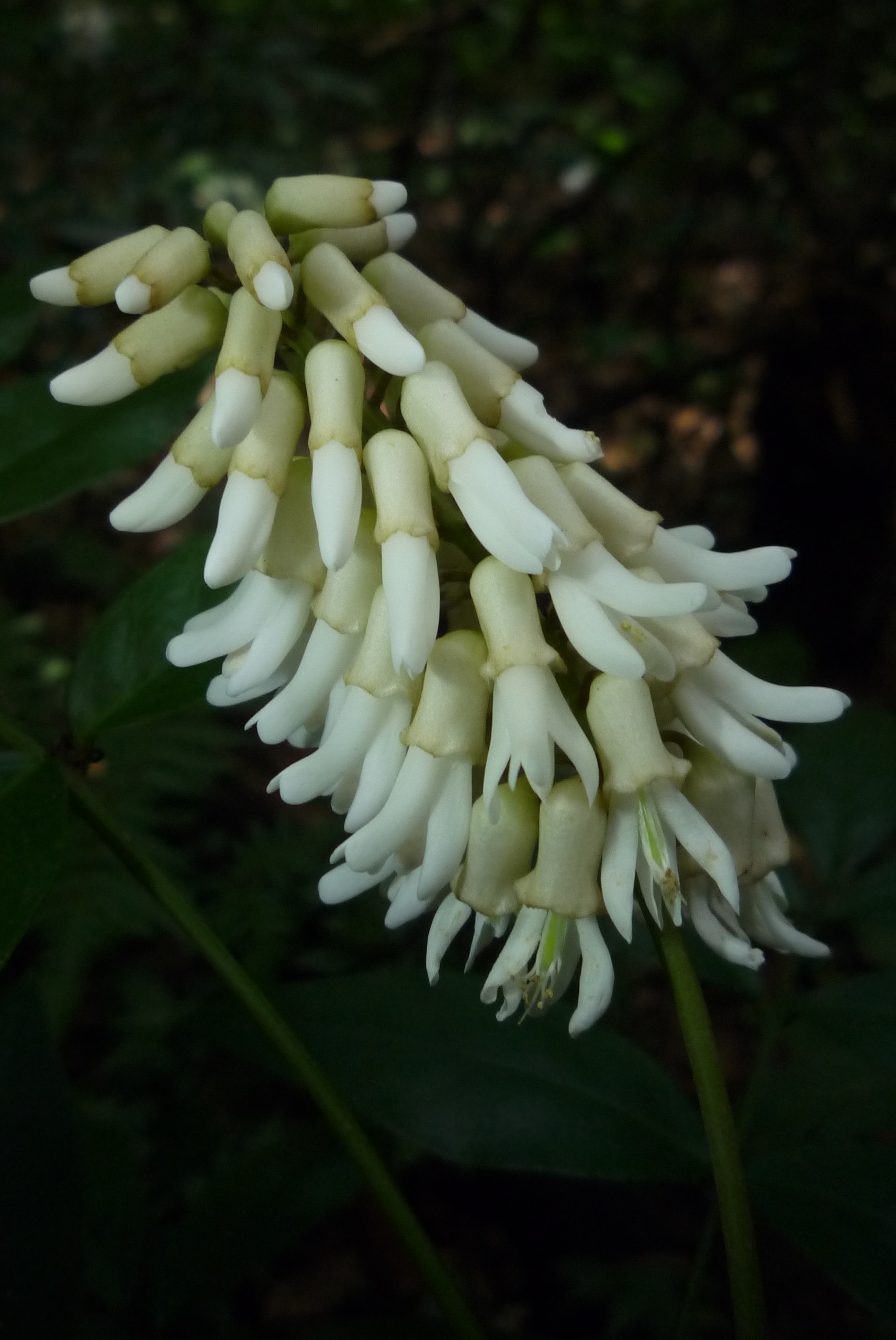
- Euchresta formosana

Scientific classification
- Kingdom: Plantae
- Clade: Tracheophytes
- Clade: Angiosperms
- Clade: Eudicots
- Clade: Rosids
- Order: Fabales
- Family: Fabaceae
- Subfamily: Faboideae
- Tribe: Sophoreae
- Genus: Euchresta; Benn.

Type species
- Euchresta horsfieldii (Lesch.) Benn.

Species
- 4; see text

= Euchresta =

Genus of legumes

Euchresta is a genus of flowering plants in the family Fabaceae. It belongs to the subfamily Faboideae. It includes four species native to eastern and southeastern Asia, from the eastern Himalayas to Indochina, southern China, Korea, Japan, Taiwan, and Malesia.

== Species ==
Euchresta comprises the following species:

- Euchresta formosana (Hayata) Ohwi
- Euchresta horsfieldii (Lesch.) Benn.
- Euchresta japonica Hook.f. ex Regel
- Euchresta tubulosa Dunn
  - var. longiracemosa (S.Lee & H.Q.Wen) C.Chen
  - var. tubulosa Dunn

== Hybrids ==
The following hybrids have been described:

- ×Euchresta strigillosa C.Y.Wu
