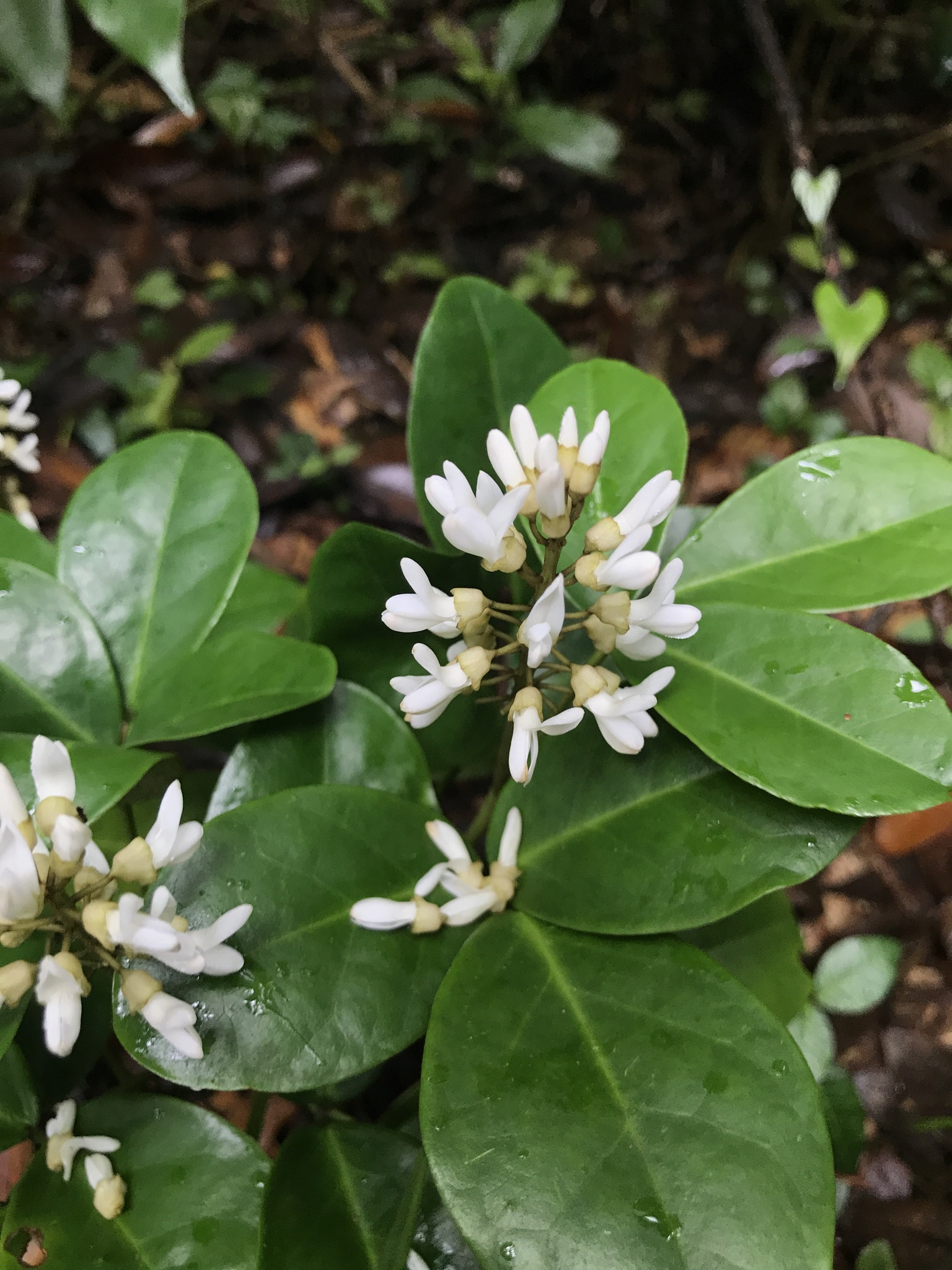
- In Japan

Scientific classification
- Kingdom: Plantae
- Clade: Embryophytes
- Clade: Tracheophytes
- Clade: Spermatophytes
- Clade: Angiosperms
- Clade: Eudicots
- Clade: Rosids
- Order: Fabales
- Family: Fabaceae
- Subfamily: Faboideae
- Genus: Euchresta
- Species: E. japonica

Binomial name
- Euchresta japonica Hook.f. ex Regel

Synonyms
- Euchresta trifoliolata Merr.

= Euchresta japonica =

Species of flowering plant

Euchresta japonica is a species of flowering plant in the family Fabaceae. It is native to southern China, central and southern Japan, and Jeju Province in South Korea.
