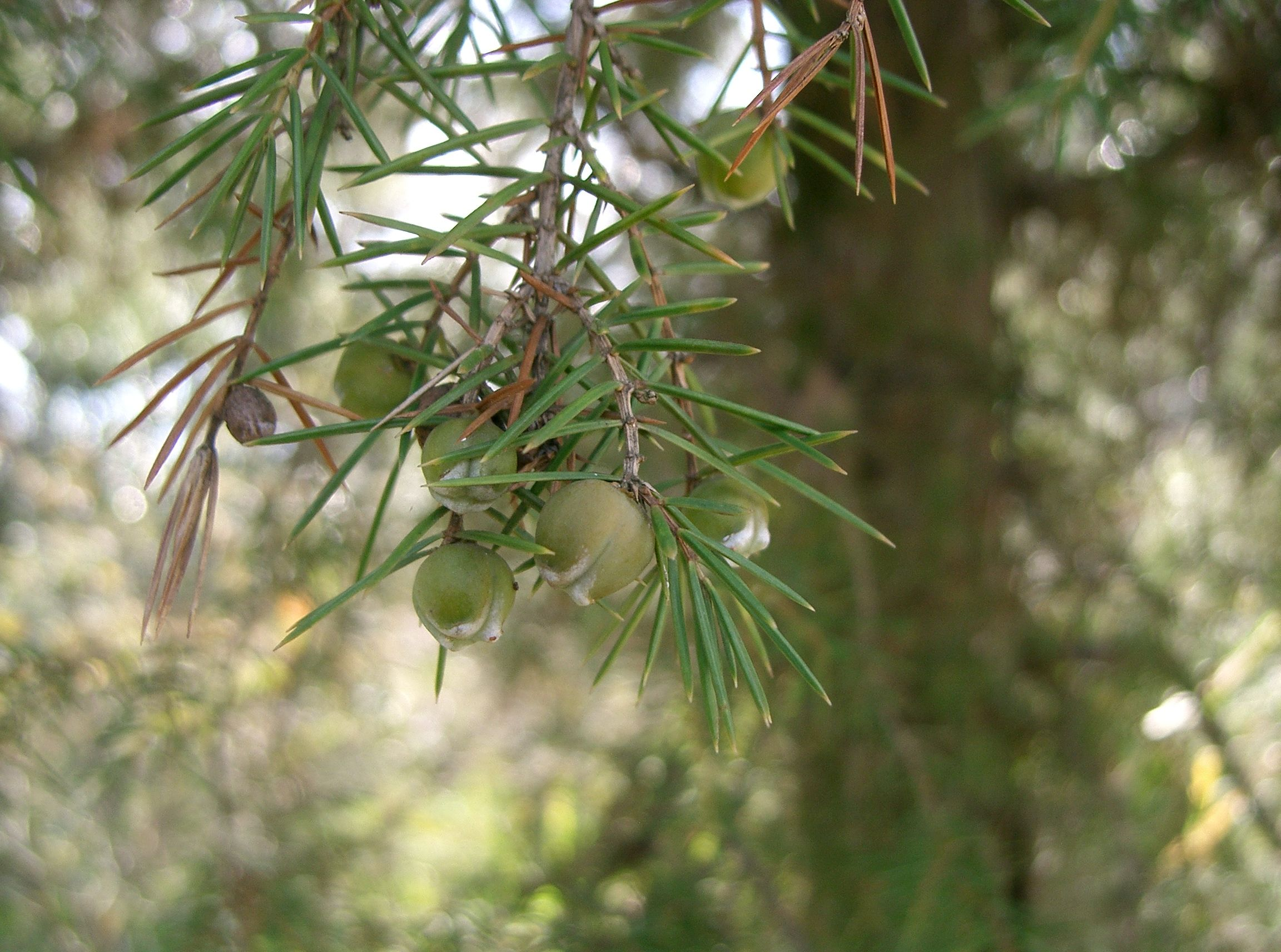
- Foliage and immature cones

Conservation status
- Least Concern (IUCN 3.1)

Scientific classification
- Kingdom: Plantae
- Clade: Tracheophytes
- Clade: Gymnospermae
- Division: Pinophyta
- Class: Pinopsida
- Order: Cupressales
- Family: Cupressaceae
- Genus: Juniperus
- Species: J. rigida

Binomial name
- Juniperus rigida Siebold & Zucc.

= Juniperus rigida =

Species of conifer

Juniperus rigida, the temple juniper, is a species of juniper, native to northern China, Mongolia, Korea, Japan, and the far southeast of Russia (Sakhalin and Primorsky Krai), occurring at altitudes of 10–2,200 metres (33–7,218 ft). The species is also naturalized in the United States (California and Alabama). It is closely related to Juniperus communis (common juniper) and Juniperus conferta (shore juniper), the latter sometimes treated as a variety or subspecies of J. rigida.

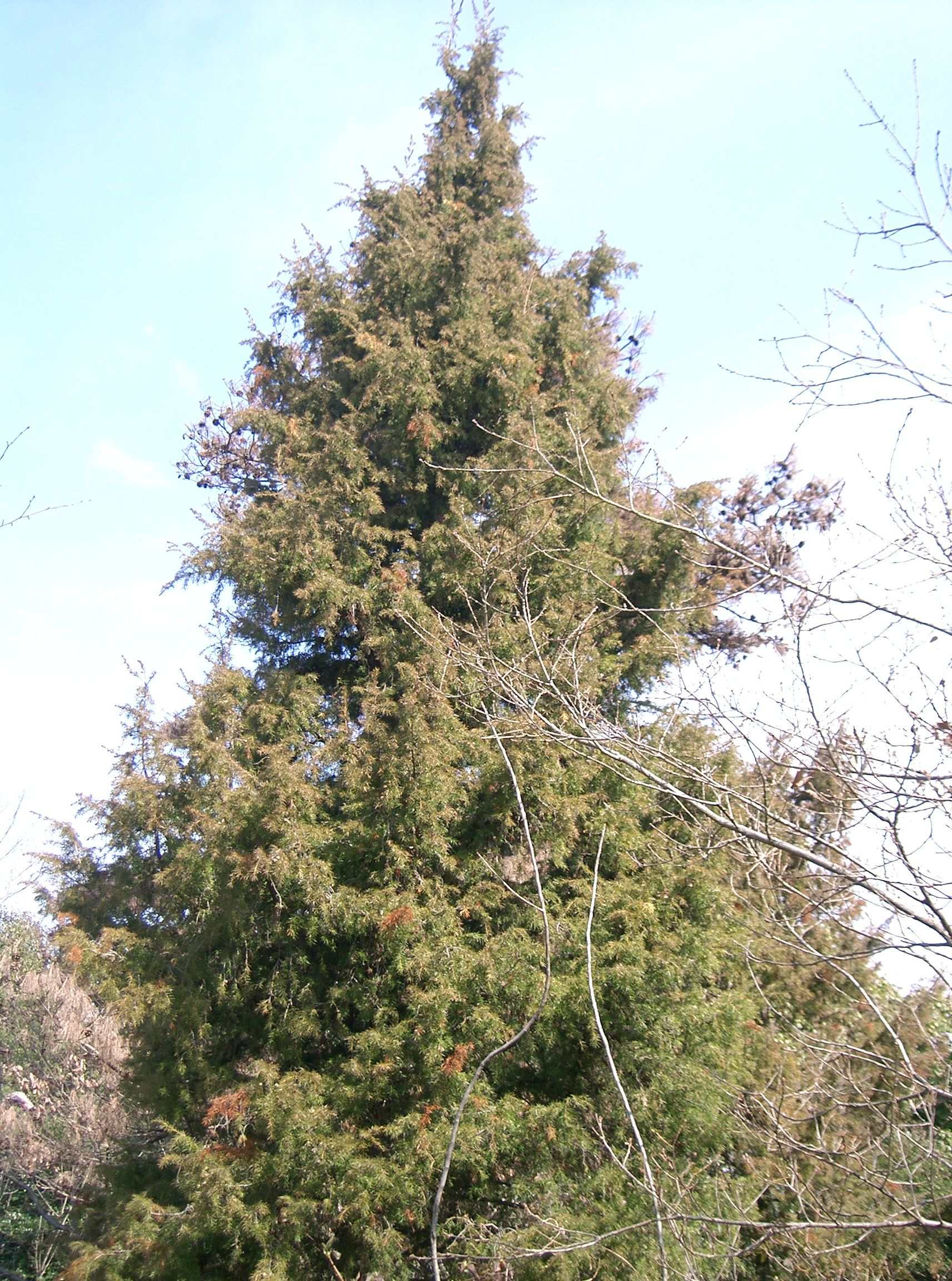
Tree

It is a shrub or small tree growing to a height of 6–10 metres (20–33 ft) and a trunk diameter up to 50 centimetres (20 in). The leaves are evergreen, needle-like, in whorls of three, bright green to yellowish-green, 10–23 millimetres (1/2–1 in) long and 1–1.3 mm broad, with a single white stomatal band on the inner surface. It is dioecious, with separate male and female plants. The seed cones are berry-like, green ripening in 18 months to dark purple or brownish with a variable whitish waxy coating; they are spherical, 5–9 mm diameter, and have three (rarely six) fused scales in one (rarely two) whorls of three, each with a single seed (when six scales, only the three larger scales with seeds). The seeds are dispersed when birds eat the cones, digesting the fleshy scales and passing the hard seeds in their droppings. The pollen cones are yellow, 3–5 mm long, and fall soon after shedding their pollen in spring.

It is grown as an ornamental tree, often planted in temple grounds in Japan. It is also often grown as bonsai.

== Gallery ==
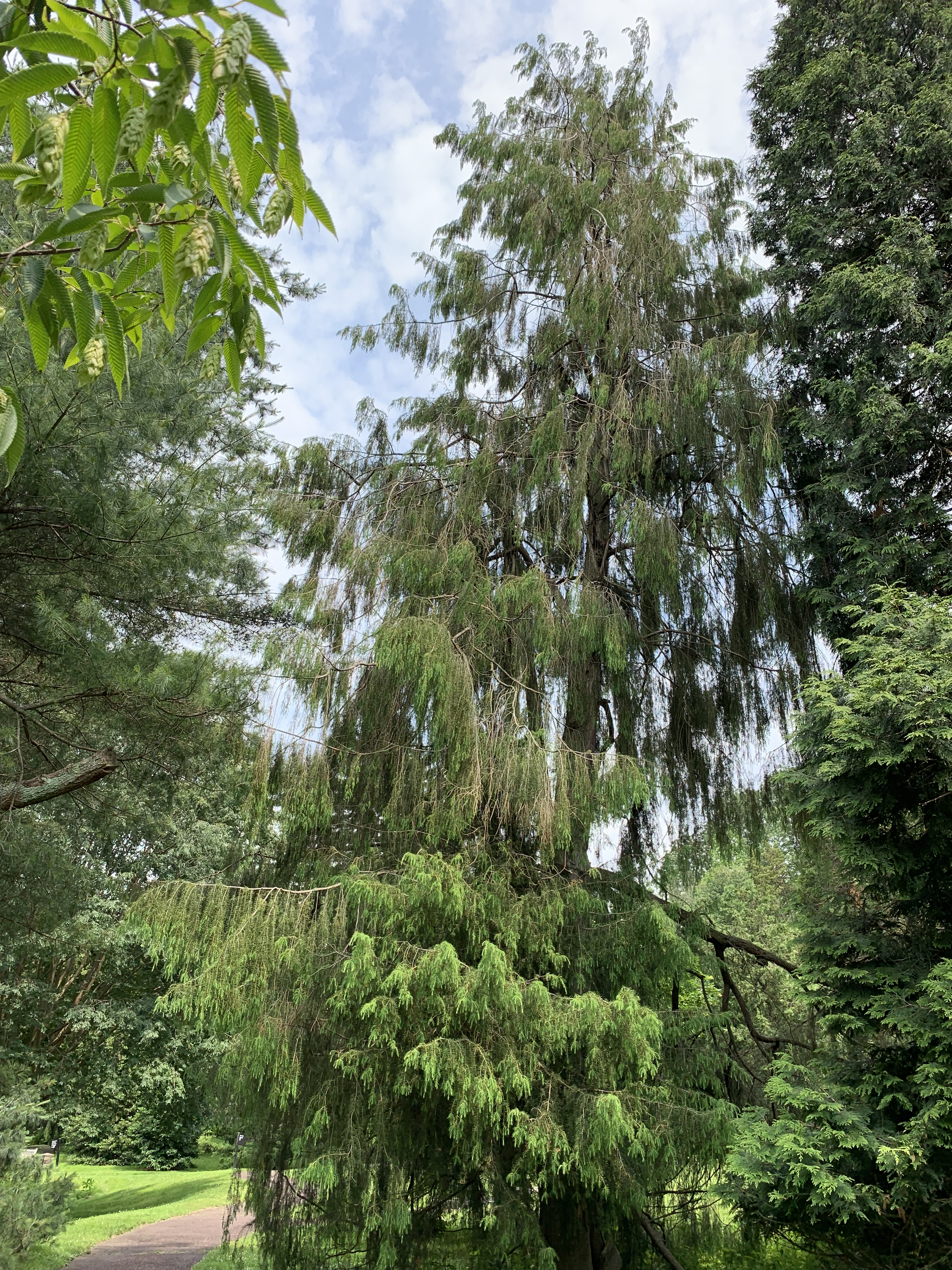
Specimen tree

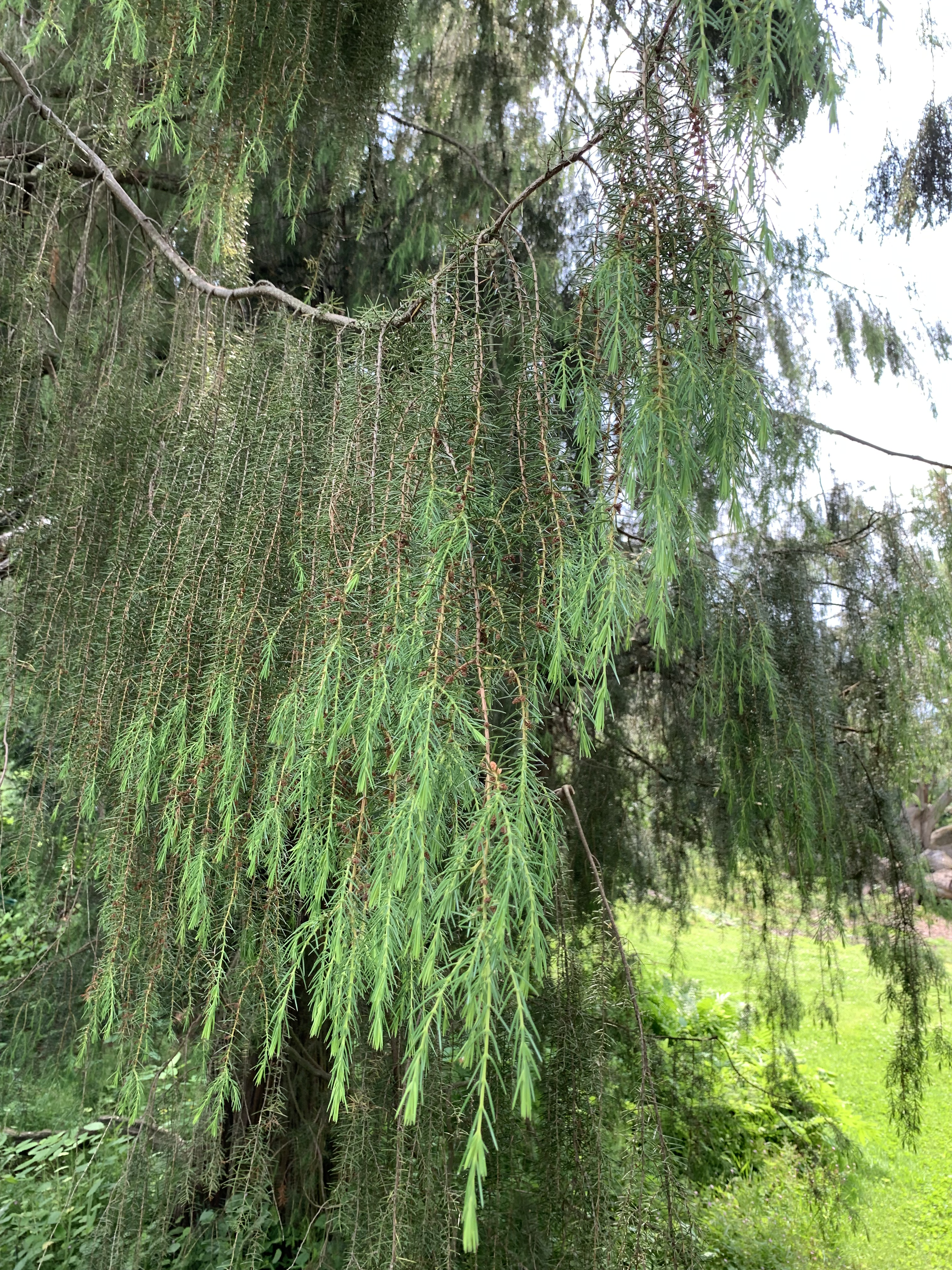
Pendulous branchlets

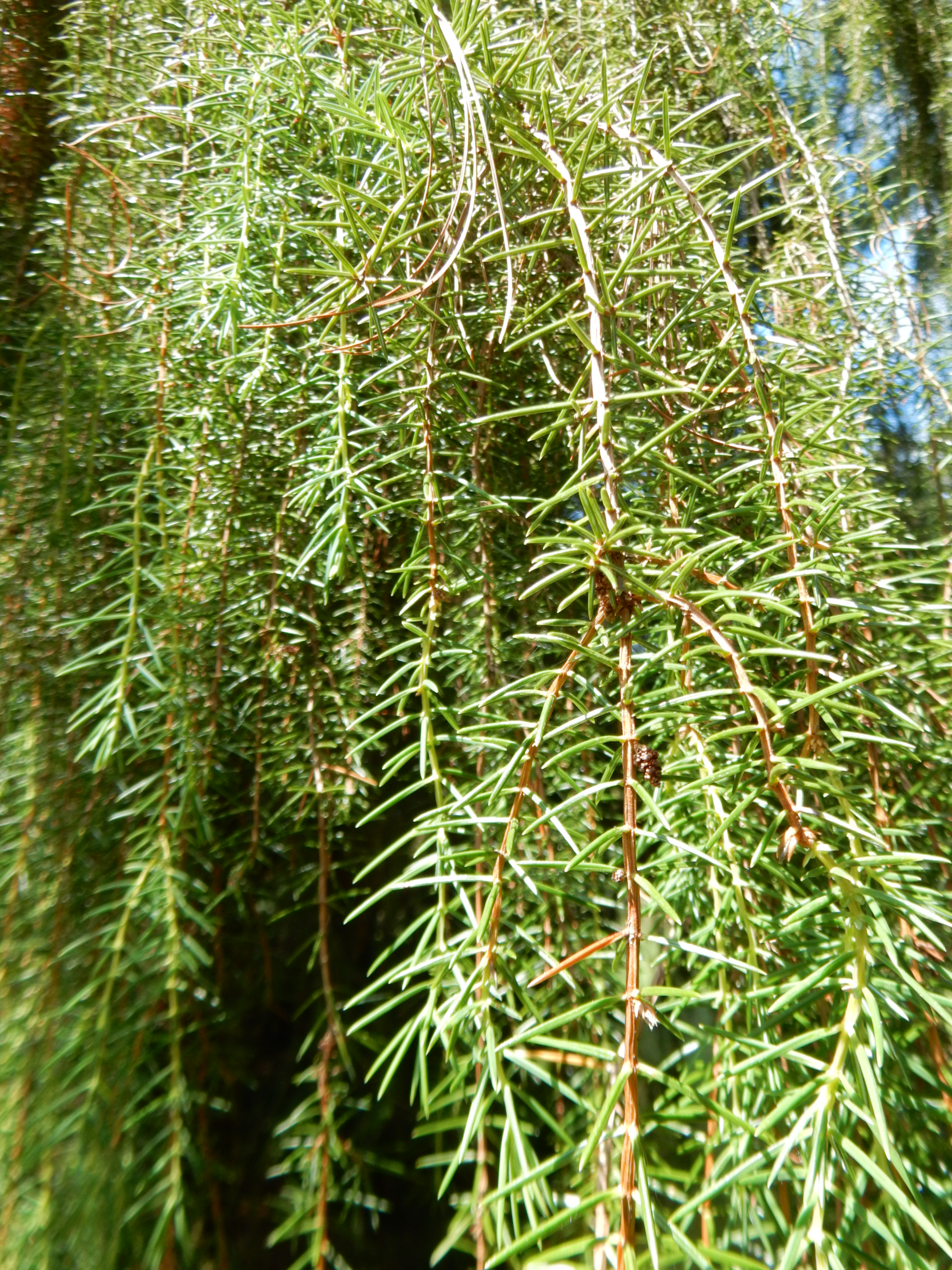
Foliage

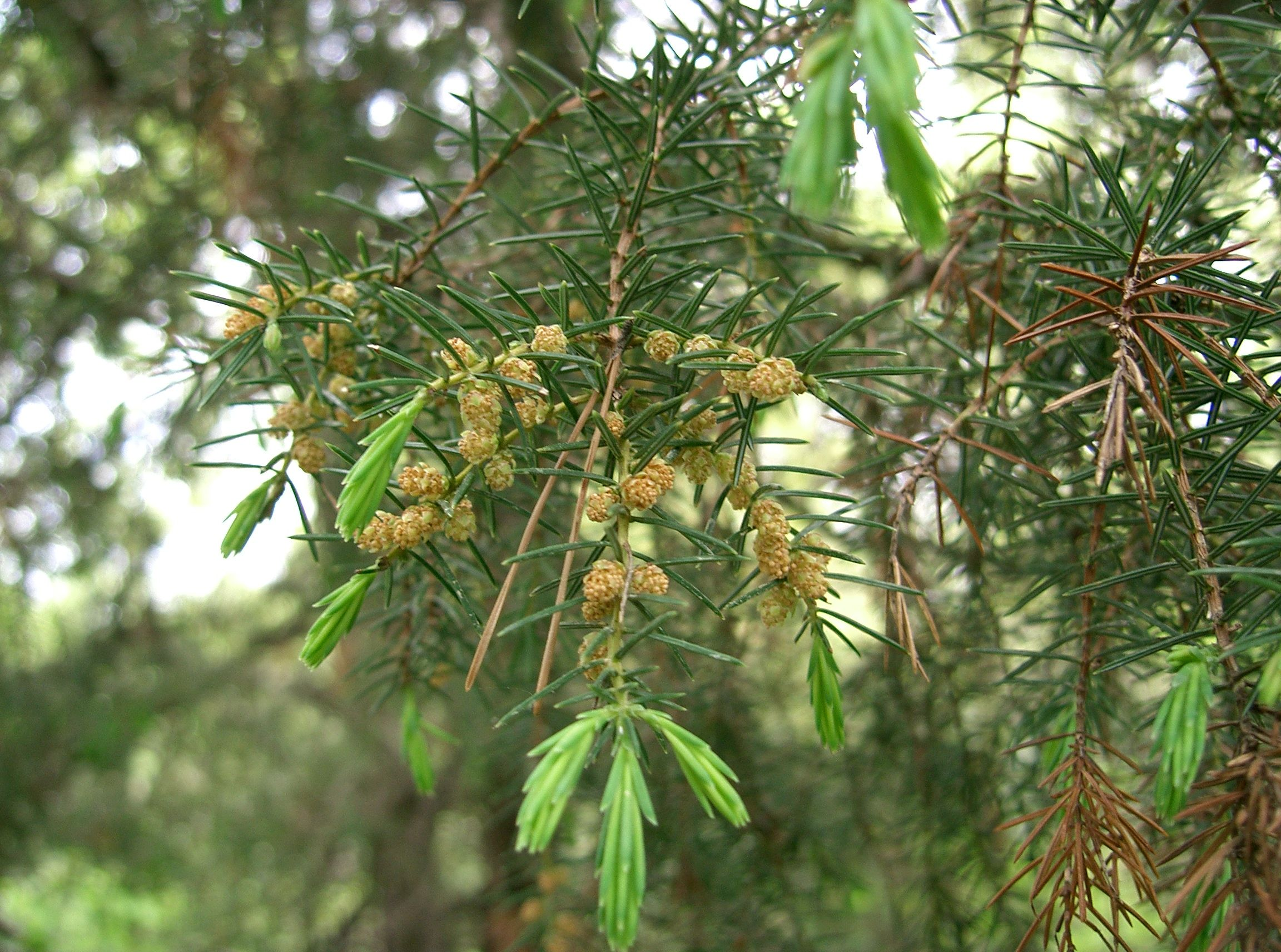
Foliage and pollen cones

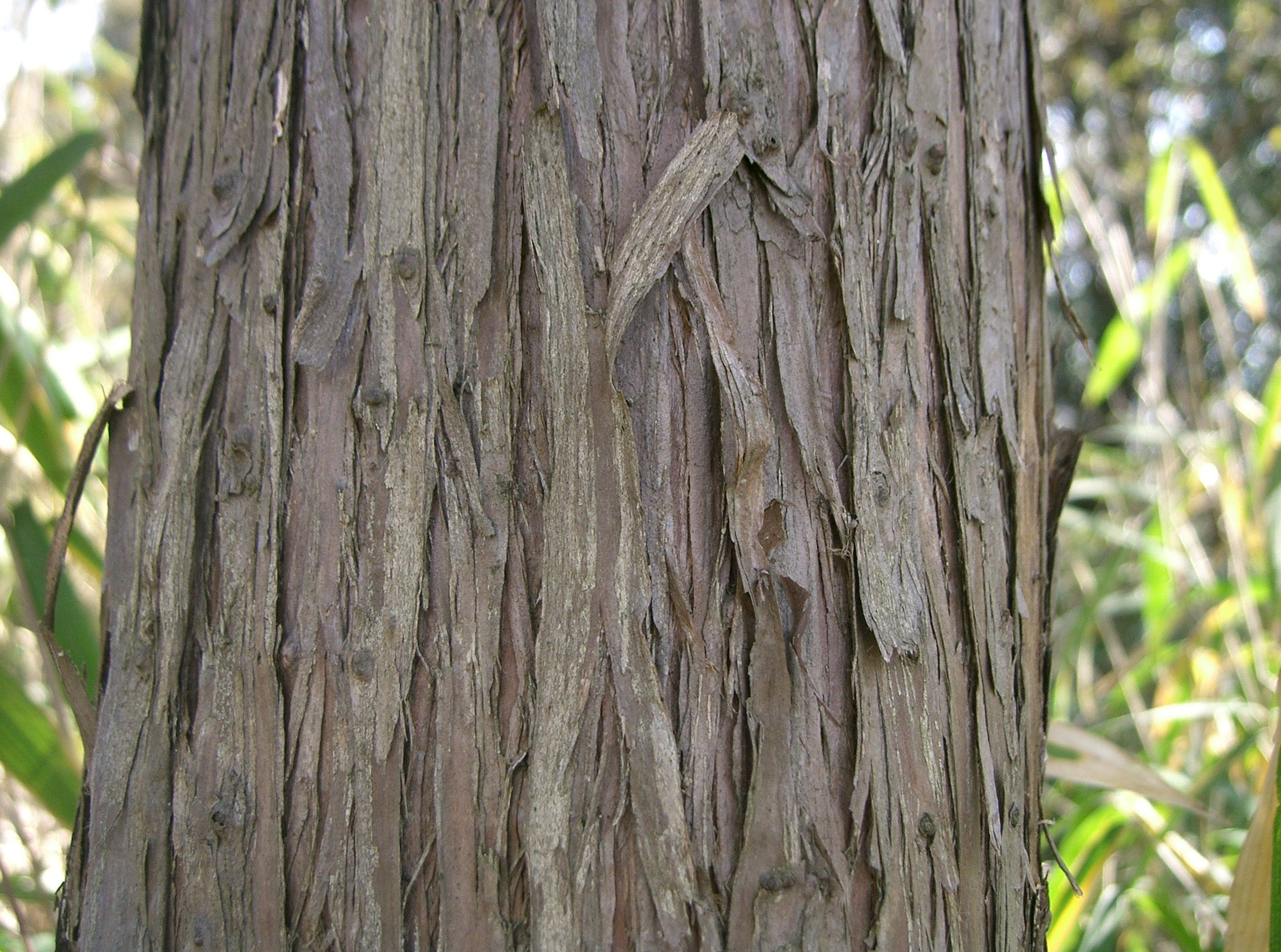
Bark

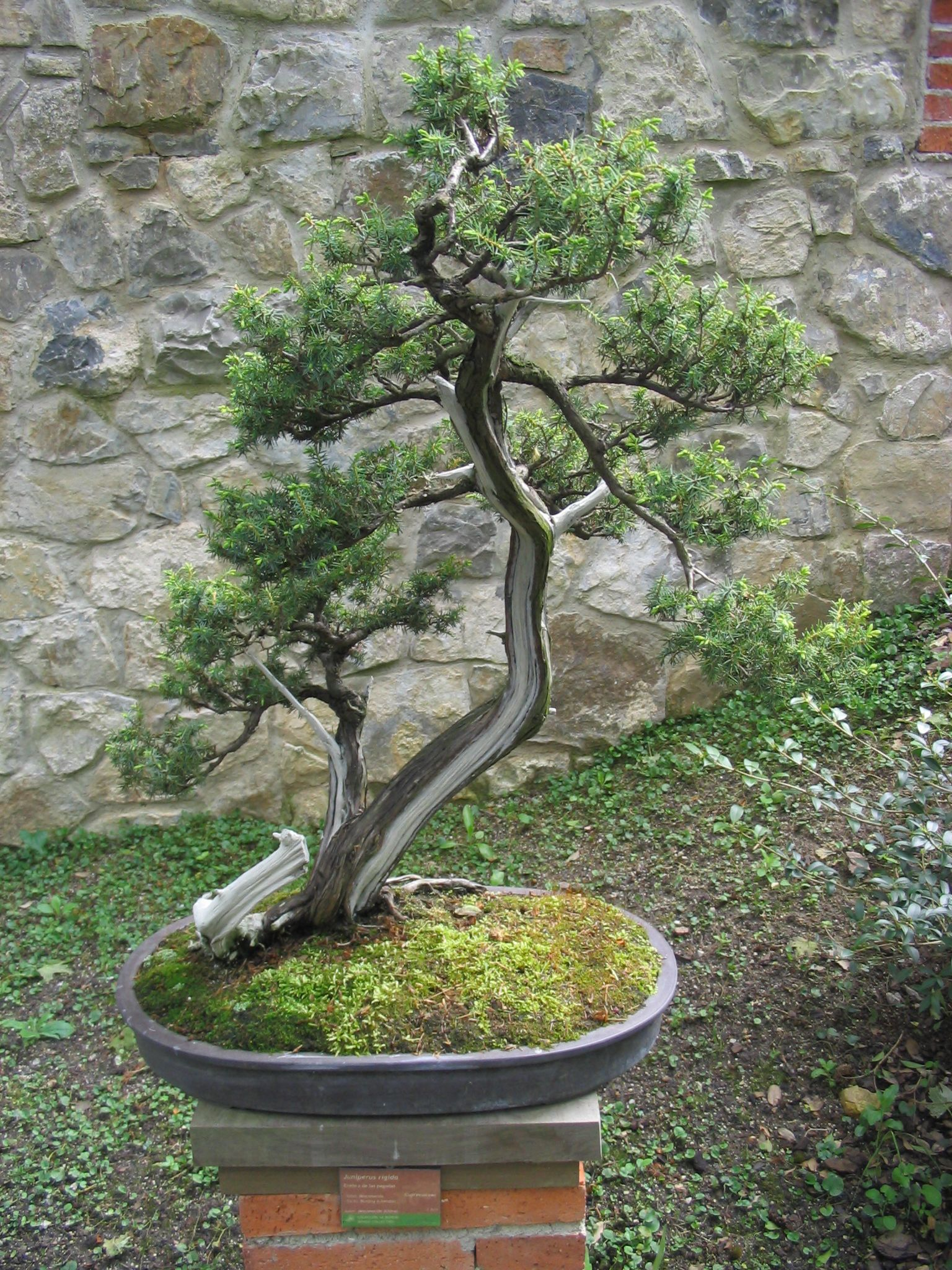
Trained as a bonsai.
