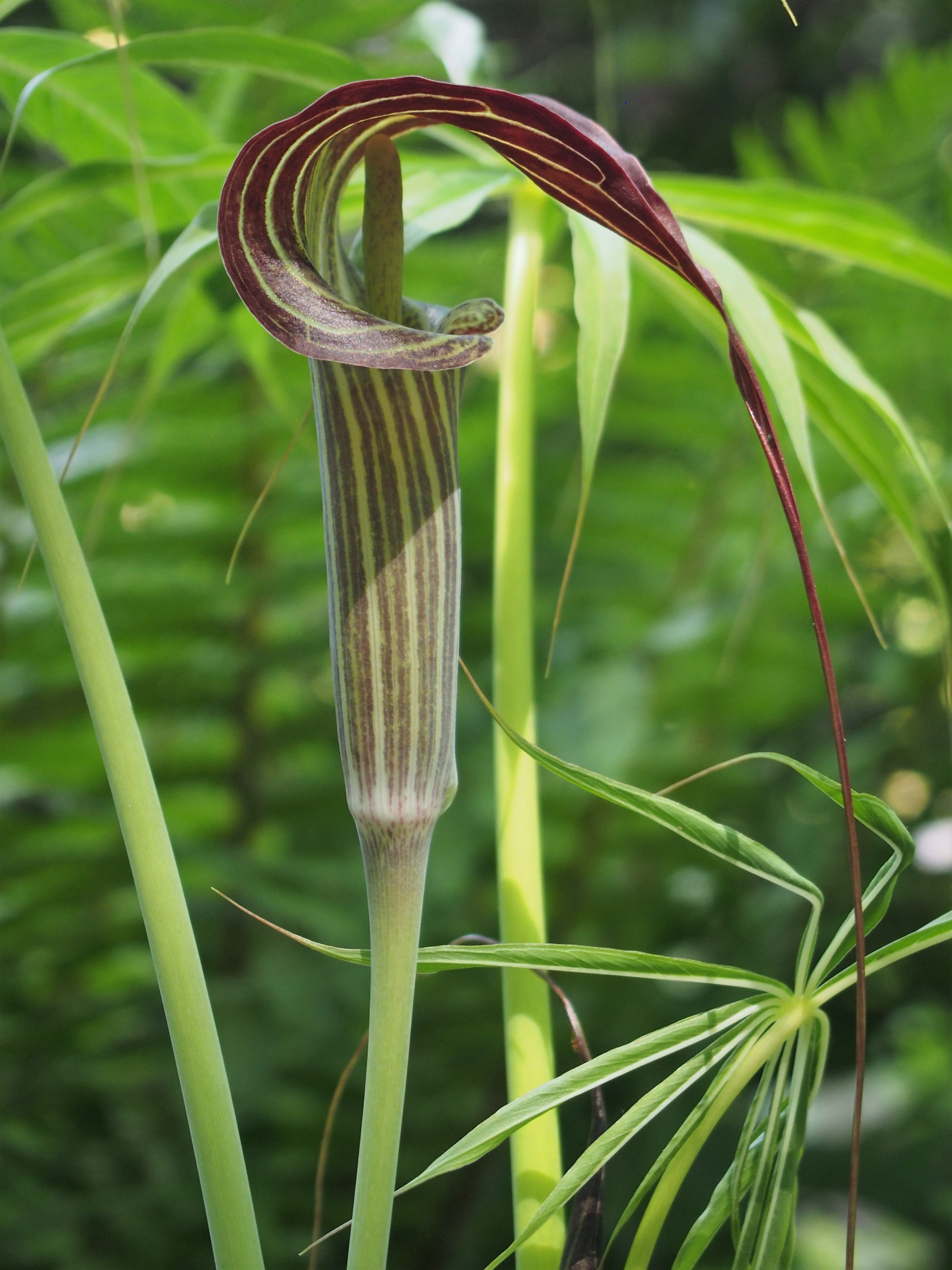

Scientific classification
- Kingdom: Plantae
- Clade: Tracheophytes
- Clade: Angiosperms
- Clade: Monocots
- Order: Alismatales
- Family: Araceae
- Genus: Arisaema
- Species: A. erubescens

Binomial name
- Arisaema erubescens (Wall.) Schott

Synonyms
- Arum erubescens Wall.

= Arisaema erubescens =

Species of flowering plant

Arisaema erubescens is a flowering plant species in the genus Arisaema, endemic to Nepal.

== Description ==
The species' tuber is globose and is 2–7 centimetres (0.79–2.76 in) wide. It have 3 cataphylls which are dark green and carry white spots which are 55 centimetres (22 in) long and have an acute apex. It petiole is 2 centimetres (0.79 in) long while its peduncle is only 75 centimetres (30 in) long with a free part being 9 centimetres (3.5 in). The plant spathe is green in colour and have cylindrical tubes which are 6–7 centimetres (2.4–2.8 in) by 1.5 centimetres (0.59 in) and are sometimes stripeless. The limb of its throat is deep green in colour but can sometimes be with purple coloured outside margin and pale green inside. It is also triangular to ovate and is 8–12 centimetres (3.1–4.7 in) long and 4–8 centimetres (1.6–3.1 in) wide.

== Uses ==
Arisaema erubescens contains the phenolic compound paeonol.
