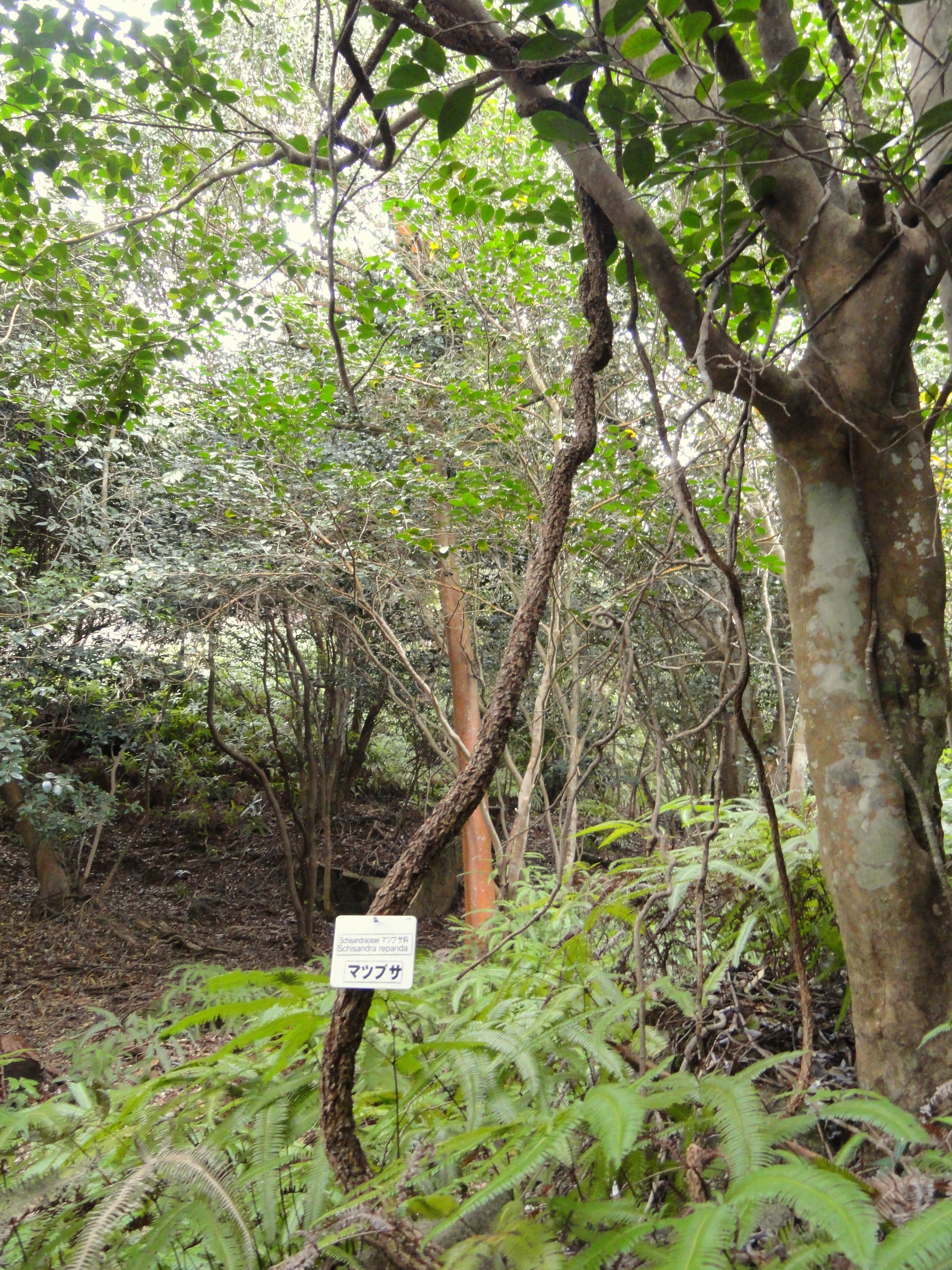

Scientific classification
- Kingdom: Plantae
- Clade: Tracheophytes
- Clade: Angiosperms
- Order: Austrobaileyales
- Family: Schisandraceae
- Genus: Schisandra
- Species: S. repanda

Binomial name
- Schisandra repanda (Siebold & Zucc.) Radlk.

Synonyms
- Maximowiczia nigra (Maxim.) Nakai; Schisandra discolor Nakai; Schisandra nigra Maxim.

= Schisandra repanda =

Species of flowering plant

Schisandra repanda is a deciduous vine growing to 6 meters, endemic to Japan and Korea.
