= Bradybaena bouryi =

Scientific classification
- Domain: Eukaryota
- Kingdom: Animalia
- Phylum: Mollusca
- Class: Gastropoda
- Order: Stylommatophora
- Family: Camaenidae
- Subfamily: Bradybaeninae
- Genus: Bradybaena
- Species: B. bouryi

Binomial name
- Bradybaena bouryi de Morgan, 1885

Synonyms
- Petasia bouryi de Morgan, 1885

Species of snail

Bradybaena bouryi is a species of snail native within the country of Malaysia.

== Description ==
B. bouryi is described as having a white, smooth, small, and flat shell with a very distinct linear whorl pattern. The body is about 3 mm in height and 3 mm in width.

== Diet ==
B. bouryi is known to feed by grazing on detritus, as seen throughout the Helicoidei infraorder.

== Distribution and habitat ==
B. bouryi is native to the Malay Peninsula in Asia, living in a terrestrial habitat.
