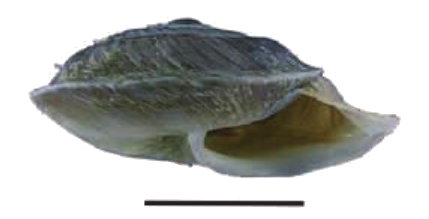
- A shell of Pseudiberus chentingensis

Scientific classification
- Domain: Eukaryota
- Kingdom: Animalia
- Phylum: Mollusca
- Class: Gastropoda
- Order: Stylommatophora
- Family: Camaenidae
- Genus: Pseudiberus
- Species: P. chentingensis

Binomial name
- Pseudiberus chentingensis Yen, 1935

Synonyms
- Pseudiberus cixianensis Chen & Zhang, 2000

= Pseudiberus chentingensis =

Species of gastropod

Pseudiberus chentingensis is a species of air-breathing land snail, a terrestrial pulmonate gastropod mollusk in the subfamily Bradybaeninae.

== Subspecies ==
- Pseudiberus chentingensis latispira Yen, 1935

== Distribution ==
This species is found in China. The type locality is Zhengding (Changing), in Hebei Province.

== Description ==
The shell has 4.5–5 2/3 whorls. The width of the shell is 19.4–22.3 mm, and the height of the shell is 9.7–11.1 mm.

The width of the shell of Pseudiberus chentingensis latispira is 14.1–21 mm. The height of the shell of Pseudiberus chentingensis latispira is 7.1–12.3 mm.

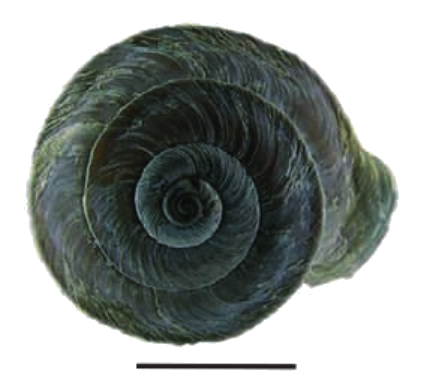
Apical view.

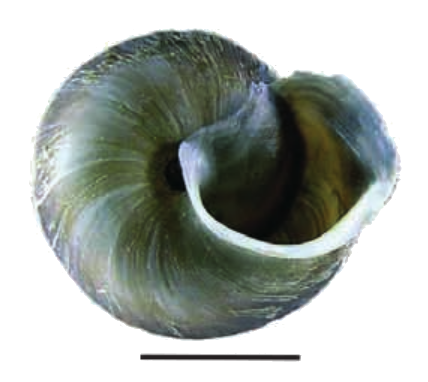
Umbilical view.
