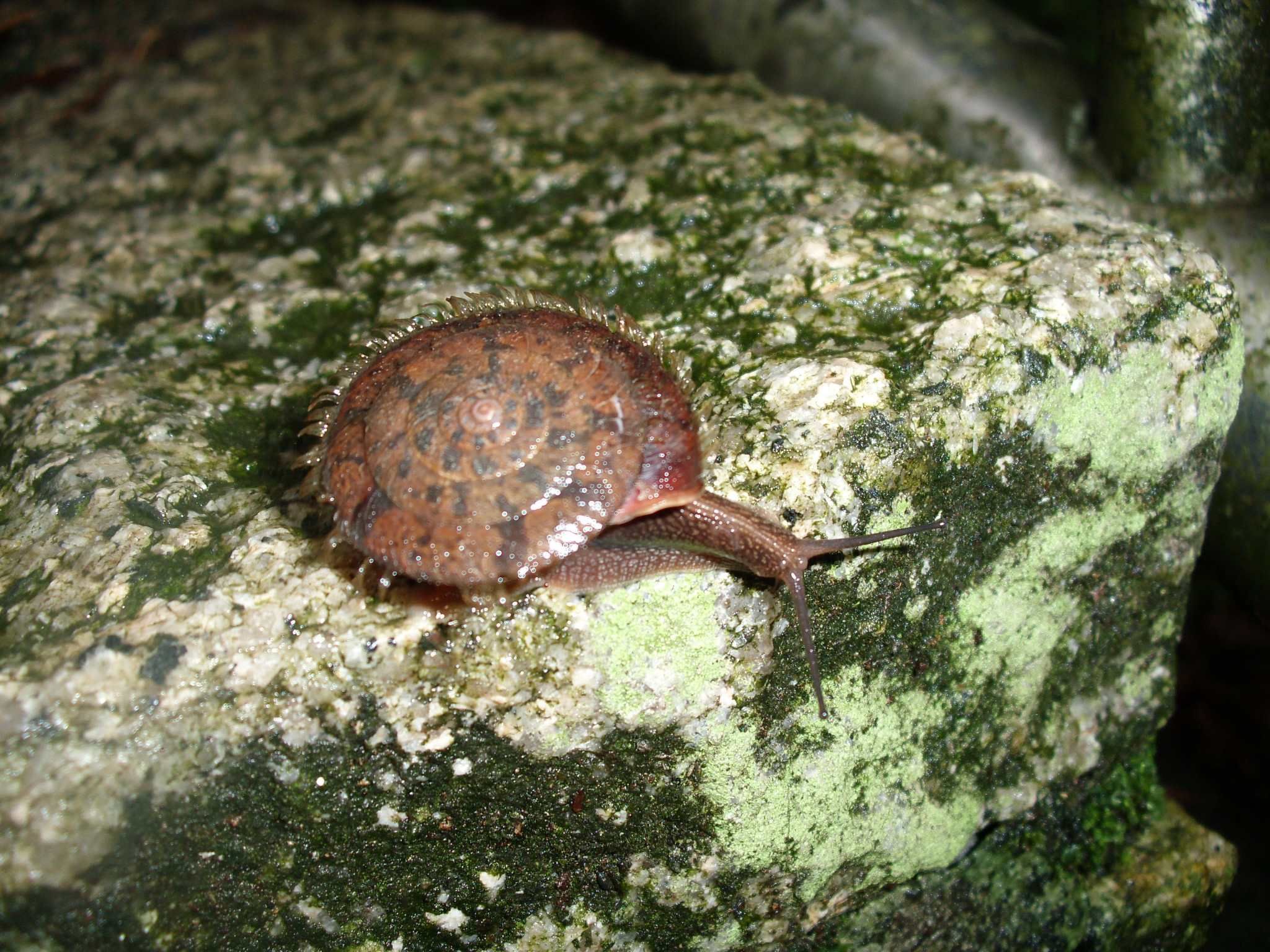
- A live specimen of Plectotropis mackenzii

Scientific classification
- Kingdom: Animalia
- Phylum: Mollusca
- Class: Gastropoda
- Order: Stylommatophora
- Family: Camaenidae
- Subfamily: Bradybaeninae
- Tribe: Aegistini
- Genus: Plectotropis von Martens, 1860

Type species
- Helix pretiosa Albers, 1850

Species
- See text

Synonyms
- Aegista (Plectotropis) E. von Martens, 1860; Eulota (Plectotropis) E. von Martens, 1860; Helix (Plectotropis) Martens, 1860; Helix (Thea) Albers, 1850 (Invalid: junior homonym of Thea Mulsant, 1846 [Coleoptera]; Plectotropis is a replacement name); Thea Albers, 1850 (invalid: junior homonym of Thea Mulsant, 1846 [Coleoptera]; Plectotropis is a replacement name)

= Plectotropis =

Genus of gastropods

Plectotropis is a genus of air-breathing land snails, terrestrial pulmonate gastropod mollusks in the family Camaenidae.

== Nomenclature ==
Plectotropis is a substitute name for Thea Albers, 1850, junior homonym of Thea Mulsant, 1846. Martens designated Helix elegantissima L. Pfeiffer, 1849 as type species, which was not originally included in Thea.

== General characteristics ==
(Original description in Latin) The shell is openly and deeply umbilicate, lenticular in shape, thin and transparent, and bears a distinct keel. It has 6.5 whorls, the first five increasing slowly in size, and the body whorl does not descend anteriorly. The keel is sharp, compressed, and finely crenulate.

The aperture is axe‑shaped to somewhat rhomboidal. The peristome has a thin, slightly expanded upper margin, while the basal margin is scarcely dilated and is briefly reflected.

== Species ==
- Plectotropis aemula (Gude, 1900)
- Plectotropis akowtongensis (Theobald, 1859)
- Plectotropis albocrenatus (Bavay & Dautzenberg, 1909)
- Plectotropis applanata (Möllendorff, 1884)
- Plectotropis austeni Preston, 1915
- Plectotropis barbosella (Heude, 1882)
- Plectotropis biggiei Preston, 1910
- Plectotropis bonnieri (H. Fischer, 1898)
- Plectotropis brevibarbis (L. Pfeiffer, 1859)
- Plectotropis chondroderma Möllendorff, 1900
- Plectotropis conella (A. Adams, 1868)
- Plectotropis conomphala Pilsbry & Y. Hirase, 1903
- Plectotropis couturieri (Bavay & Dautzenberg, 1909)
- Plectotropis dasytricha (Bavay & Dautzenberg, 1909)
- Plectotropis diplogramme Möllendorff, 1902
- Plectotropis elegantissima (L. Pfeiffer, 1849)
- Plectotropis esakii (Kuroda, 1973)
- Plectotropis gerlachi (Martens, 1881)
- Plectotropis hatakedai (Kuroda & Habe, 1951)
- Plectotropis horrida (Pilsbry, 1900)
- Plectotropis hupensis (Gredler, 1885)
- Plectotropis icela Pilsbry, 1934
- Plectotropis inexpectata (Kuroda & Minato, 1977)
- Plectotropis itoi (Kuroda & Azuma, 1982)
- Plectotropis kiusiuensis (Pilsbry, 1900)
- Plectotropis kraepeleni Leschke, 1914
- Plectotropis laciniosula (Heude, 1885)
- Plectotropis lancasteri (Gude, 1919)
- Plectotropis lepidophora (Gude, 1900)
- Plectotropis lithina (Heude, 1885)
- Plectotropis lofouana (Möllendorff, 1888)
- Plectotropis mackensii (Adams & Reeve, 1850)
- Plectotropis marginata (Pilsbry & Y. Hirase, 1903)
- Plectotropis mentaweiense Degner, 1928
- Plectotropis minima Pilsbry, 1934
- Plectotropis nunobikiensis (Ogaito & Sorita, 1981)
- Plectotropis nutans Gude, 1914
- Plectotropis lithina (Heude, 1885)
- Plectotropis lofouana (Möllendorff, 1888)
- Plectotropis omiensis (Pilsbry, 1902)
- Plectotropis osbeckii (Philippi, 1847)
- Plectotropis pannosa (Pilsbry, 1902)
- Plectotropis patungensis (Gredler, 1887)
- Plectotropis pentagonostoma Möllendorff, 1899
- Plectotropis pressa (Pilsbry & Y. Hirase, 1904)
- Plectotropis pseudopatula Möllendorff, 1899
- Plectotropis quelpartensis (Pilsbry & Hirase, 1908)
- Plectotropis repanda (L. Pfeiffer, 1861)
- PLectotropis scepasma (Reeve, 1854)
- Plectotropis scitula (Pilsbry & Y. Hirase, 1908)
- Plectotropis sinkaitzensis Pilsbry, 1934
- Plectotropis squamulifera (Möllendorff, 1887)
- Plectotropis stenomphala Möllendorff, 1899
- Plectotropis sterilis (Heude, 1890)
- Plectotropis subconella (Möllendorff, 1888)
- Plectotropis quelpartensis (Pilsbry & Hirase, 1908)
- Plectotropis repanda (L. Pfeiffer, 1861)
- Plectotropis scepasma (Reeve, 1854)
- Plectotropis tapeina (Benson, 1836)
- Plectotropis trichotropis (L. Pfeiffer, 1850)
- Plectotropis visayana (Möllendorff, 1888)
- Plectotropis vulgivaga (Schmacker & O. Boettger, 1890)
- Plectotropis xydaea (Bavay & Dautzenberg, 1909)
- Plectotropis yonganensis W.-C. Zhou, Q. Xiao, D.-N. Chen & C.-C. Hwang, 2011

Taxa inquirenda

- Plectotropis comata Sturany, 1899
- Plectotropis delectabilis Ehrmann, 1900 (synonym: Aegista delectabilis (P. Ehrmann, 1900) )
- Plectotropis scabricula (A. Adams, 1868)
- Plectotropis setocincta (A. Adams, 1868)

Synonyms

- Plectotropis oldhami (Benson, 1859): synonym of Aegista oldhami (Benson, 1859)
