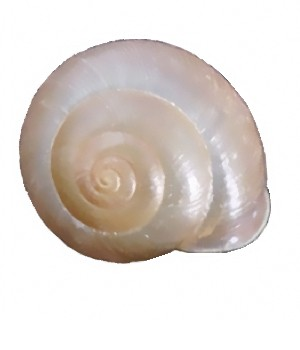
- A shell of Bradybaena similaris

Scientific classification
- Kingdom: Animalia
- Phylum: Mollusca
- Class: Gastropoda
- Order: Stylommatophora
- Family: Camaenidae
- Subfamily: Bradybaeninae
- Genus: Bradybaena (Beck, 1837)

Type species
- Helix similaris Férussac, 1822

Synonyms
- Bradybaena (Bradybaena) H. Beck, 1837; Bradybaena thakkholensis Schileyko & Kuznetsov, 1998; Eulota (Eulotella) E. von Martens, 1891; Eulotella E. von Martens, 1891; Helix (Bradybaena) Beck, 1837 (original rank); Helix (Eulotella) E. von Martens, 1891

= Bradybaena =

Genus of gastropods

Bradybaena is a genus of small, air-breathing land snails, or terrestrial molluscs in the family Camaenidae.

Species of snail within this genus create and use love darts prior to mating.

== Distribution ==
This genus occurs in eastern and southern Asia. The European species Fruticicola fruticum was previously in this genus.

== Species ==
- Bradybaena acustina (Möllendorff, 1899)
- Bradybaena bocageana (Crosse, 1864)
- Bradybaena bouryi (de Morgan, 1885)
- Bradybaena brevispira (H. Adams, 1870)
- Bradybaena carphochroa (Möllendorff, 1899)
- Bradybaena cestus (Benson, 1836)
- Bradybaena chrysomphala (Möllendorff, 1899)
- Bradybaena circulus (L. Pfeiffer, 1846)
- Bradybaena cochinchinensis (L. Pfeiffer, 1862)
- Bradybaena cremata (Heude, 1882)
- Bradybaena dectica (Mabille, 1888)
- Bradybaena diplodesma (Möllendorff, 1899)
- Bradybaena disculina Haas, 1933
- Bradybaena duplocingula (Möllendorff, 1899)
- Bradybaena eris (Möllendorff, 1899)
- Bradybaena fedtschenkoi (Martens, 1874)
- Bradybaena fortunei (L. Pfeiffer, 1850)
- Bradybaena franzhuberi Thach, 2021
- Bradybaena fuchsi (Gredler, 1878)
- Bradybaena galera (Heude, 1890)
- Bradybaena giovannalimae M. A. Lima & T. Cossignani, 2021
- Bradybaena graeseri (Mousson, 1887)
- Bradybaena halpozona (Möllendorff, 1899)
- Bradybaena huberi Thach, 2018
- Bradybaena hukudai Kuroda & Miyanaga, 1939
- Bradybaena impatiens (Heude, 1885)
- Bradybaena jiahei H.-F. Yang, Z.-Y. Fan, D.-D. Qiao & J. He, 2012
- Bradybaena jourdyi (Morlet, 1886)
- Bradybaena kiangsiensis (Martens, 1875)
- Bradybaena latilabris (Möllendorff, 1874)
- Bradybaena linjun M. Wu & Z. Chen, 2019
- Bradybaena magnaciana (Heude, 1882)
- Bradybaena micromphala (Möllendorff, 1899)
- Bradybaena paricincta (Martens, 1879)
- Bradybaena pellucida Kuroda & Habe, 1953
- Bradybaena poecila (Möllendorff, 1899)
- Bradybaena pseudocampylaea (Möllendorff, 1899)
- Bradybaena qixiaensis M. Wu & Asami, 2017
- Bradybaena radicidola (Benson, 1848)
- Bradybaena sanboensis Kuroda & Miyanaga, 1939
- Bradybaena scalpturita (Benson, 1859)
- Bradybaena schanorum (Möllendorff, 1899)
- Bradybaena schrenckii (Middendorff, 1851)
- Bradybaena selskii (Gerstfeldt, 1859)
- Bradybaena sequiniana (Heude, 1885)
- Bradybaena similaris (Férussac, 1822)
- Bradybaena straminea (Heude, 1882)
- Bradybaena strauchiana (Möllendorff, 1899)
- Bradybaena strictotaenia (Möllendorff, 1899)
- Bradybaena tenuitesta (Möllendorff, 1899)
- Bradybaena tourannensis (Souleyet, 1852)
- Bradybaena vagoina (Gredler, 1887)
- Bradybaena virgo (Pilsbry, 1927)
- Bradybaena wangkai X.-L. Sun, Z.-H. Zeng & J. He, 2017

Species brought into synonymy

- Bradybaena alaica Kuznetsov, 1998: synonym of Fruticicola alaica (Kuznetsov, 1998) (original combination)
- Bradybaena boevi Uvalieva, 1967: synonym of Fruticicola boevi (Uvalieva, 1967) (original combination)
- Bradybaena hirsuta Matiokon, 1966: synonym of Ponsadenia hirsuta (Matiokin, 1966) (original combination)
- Bradybaena changchunensis X.-L. Sun, Z.-H. Zeng & J. He, 2017 : synonym of Bradybaena virgo (Pilsbry, 1927)
- Bradybaena thakkholensis Schileyko & Kuznetsov, 1998: accepted as Bradybaena H. Beck, 1837
