= Karaftohelix =

Scientific classification
- Kingdom: Animalia
- Phylum: Mollusca
- Class: Gastropoda
- Order: Stylommatophora
- Family: Camaenidae
- Subfamily: Bradybaeninae
- Tribe: Bradybaenini
- Genus: Karaftohelix; Pilsbry, 1927

Synonyms
- Bradybaena (Karaftohelix) Pilsbry, 1927; Bradybaena (Manchurohelix) Is. Taki, 1936 junior subjective synonym; Eulota (Karaftohelix) Pilsbry, 1927; Fruticicola (Karaftohelix) Pilsbry, 1927

Genus of gastropods

Karaftohelix is a genus of air-breathing land snails, terrestrial pulmonate gastropod mollusks in the subfamily Bradybaeninae of the family Camaenidae.

== Species ==
Species within the genus Karaftohelix include:

- Karaftohelix adamsi (Kuroda & Hukuda, 1944)
- Karaftohelix arboretum G.-M. Park, 2022
- Karaftohelix arcasiana (Crosse & Debeaux, 1863)
- Karaftohelix blakeana (Newcomb, 1865)
- Karaftohelix capillata (Schileyko & Bratchik in Schileyko, 1978)
- Karaftohelix dieckmanni (Mousson, 1887)
- Karaftohelix diversita (Schileyko & Bratchik in Schileyko, 1978)
- Karaftohelix duiensis (Westerlund, 1897)
- Karaftohelix editha (A. Adams, 1868)
- Karaftohelix fiscina (Fulton, 1905)
- Karaftohelix fragilis (Pilsbry, 1927)
- Karaftohelix gainesi (Pilsbry, 1900)
- Karaftohelix incognita (Schileyko, 1988)
- Karaftohelix kudiensis (Cockerell, 1924)
- Karaftohelix kurodana (Pilsbry, 1927)
- Karaftohelix lavrushini (T. D. A. Cockerell, 1926)
- Karaftohelix maackii (Gerstfeldt, 1859)
- Karaftohelix middendorffi (Gerstfeldt, 1859)
- Karaftohelix plana (Schileyko & Bakurov in Schileyko, 1988)
- Karaftohelix selskii (Gerstfeldt, 1859)
- Karaftohelix strelkovi (Likharev & Rammelmeyer, 1952)
- Karaftohelix takahidei (Kuroda & Azuma, 1951)
- Karaftohelix twenhuaensis (Ping & T.-C. Yen, 1932)
- Karaftohelix ussuriensis (Westerlund, 1897)
- Karaftohelix vulcanica (Schileyko, 1978)

Species brought into synonymy

- Karaftohelix bocageana (Crosse, 1864): synonym of Bradybaena bocageana (Crosse, 1864) (unaccepted combination)
- Karaftohelix chishimana (Pilsbry & Hirase, 1904): synonym of Eulota chishimana Pilsbry & Hirase, 1904: synonym of Karaftohelix blakeana (Newcomb, 1865): synonym of Ainohelix blakeana (Newcomb, 1865) (unaccepted combination)
- Karaftohelix intermedia (Rymzhanov, 1983): synonym of Fruticicola intermedia (Rymzhanov, 1983) (unaccepted combination)
