= Landouria tumpeesuwanorum =

Scientific classification
- Kingdom: Animalia
- Phylum: Mollusca
- Class: Gastropoda
- Order: Stylommatophora
- Family: Camaenidae
- Genus: Landouria
- Species: L. tumpeesuwanorum

Binomial name
- Landouria tumpeesuwanorum Benchawan Nahok, Utain Chanlabut, Kitti Tanmuangpak, 2026

Species of snail

Landouria tumpeesuwanorum is a species of Camaenid snail that belongs to the taxonomic tribe Aegistini. It is native to the Lamphu Province of northeastern Thailand.

== Description ==
This species has a large shell that is brown in color. The species is characterized by its angulated whorls and its strongly keeled shell and a small flagellum that has curved ends.

== Discovery ==
The type specimen is NHLRU025 however there were an additional six living and nine shells collected when describing this species. They were collected from the Lamphu Province of northeastern Thailand. More specifically, limestone hill (17°11'12.01"N, 102°1'54.00"E) at an elevation of 373 meters.

=== Etymology ===
The species named "tumpeesuwanorum" is in honor of malacologists Chanidaporn Tumpeesuwan and Sakboworn Tumpeesuwan. This species is named in honor of them because of their work and initiation of the taxonomy of Landouria in Thailand. Their work has also been the inspiration for the authors who described Landouria tumpeesuwanorum.
