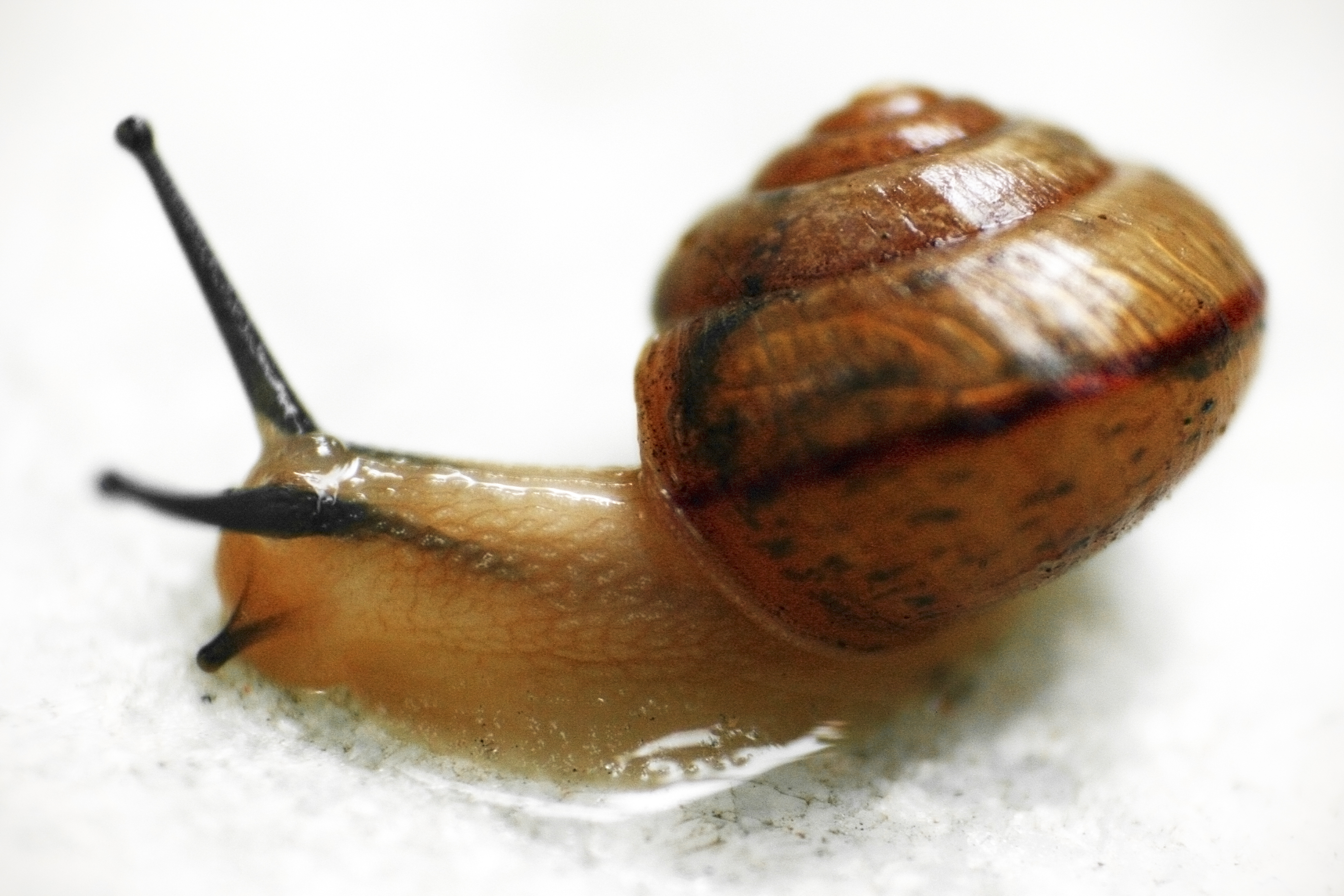
- Live Bradybaena similaris
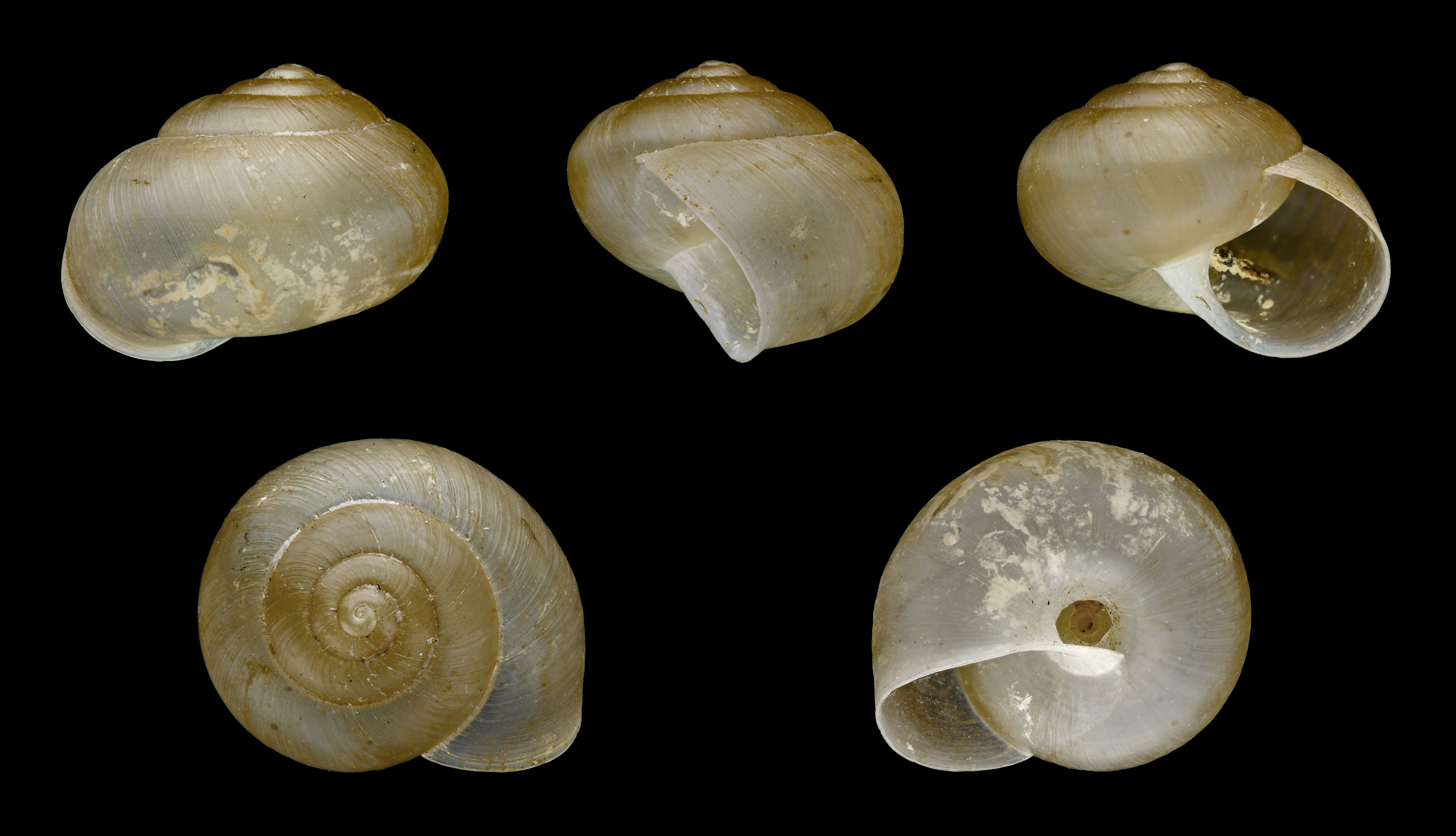
- Shell of Bradybaena similaris

Conservation status
- Secure (NatureServe)

Scientific classification
- Kingdom: Animalia
- Phylum: Mollusca
- Class: Gastropoda
- Order: Stylommatophora
- Family: Camaenidae
- Genus: Bradybaena
- Species: B. similaris

Binomial name
- Bradybaena similaris (Férussac, 1821)

Synonyms
- Helix similaris Férussac, 1821

= Bradybaena similaris =

Asian trampsnail

Species of gastropod

Bradybaena similaris, the Asian trampsnail, is a species of small land snail. It is a terrestrial pulmonate gastropod mollusc in the subfamily Bradybaeninae of the family Camaenidae. It earned the common name based on its origins, and its habit of roosting on freight containers. This habit means that this may be one of the most broadly-distributed species of terrestrial snail in the world. Bradybaena similaris is the type species of the genus Bradybaena.

== Distribution ==
This species is native to Southeast Asia, but it has been accidentally introduced to many areas around the world. The native distribution includes:

- Pratas Island, Taiwan

The introduced distribution includes states on the Gulf of Mexico, and it is widespread in Florida, USA. It has become widespread in Eastern Australia, usually living in association with exotic weeds. It can be found on Bermuda, Reunion island, Mayotte and Mauritius, New-Caledonia, Wallis and Futuna and French Polynesia.

== Description ==
The width of the shell is about 12 to 16 mm with 5 1/2 whorls. The color of the shell is light brown, often with a single, apical chestnut band. The shell is sculptured with fine, irregular growth lines and fine spiral striae. The lip of the adult shell is reflected and the columella is partially covering the umbilicus.

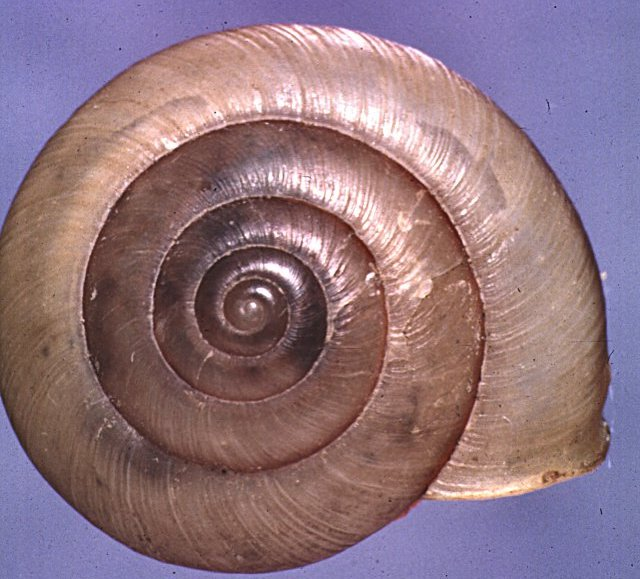
An apical view of a brown shell

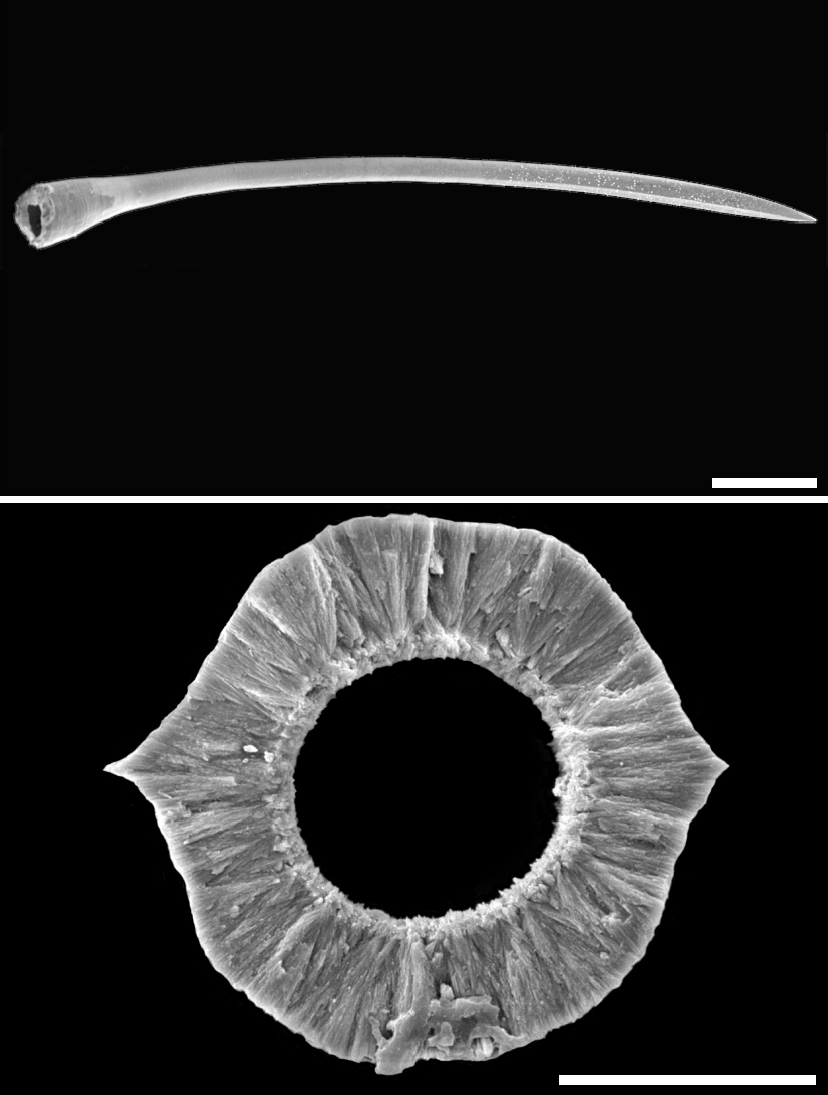
SEM image of love dart

== Food ==
The Asian trampsnail primarily consumes live plant matter, such as growing vegetables or plants like arugula. They are known for being destructive to gardens and crops because of their eating habits. It has also been observed consuming coffee rust and the mycoparasite Lecanicillium lecanii.

== Ecology ==
As an introduced species, the Asian trampsnail is often found in areas with tall grasses and high humidity. Typically this species is found in gardens, greenhouses, and similar habitats, sometimes retreating under logs or fallen branches.

This species is often common with abundant old shells on the ground and among leaf litter, as well as on vegetation and on trees. It is active after rainfall.

Dundee and Cancienne reported that this snail can survive winters in Louisiana where the temperature can fall as low as 5-10°C.

It feeds on a wide variety of plants including citrus and is considered as pest in agriculture. This snail is often exported by accident from Florida to other areas and thus poses a quarantine problem for Florida.

This species of snail creates and uses love darts during mating. Snail eggs generally take 2-4 weeks to hatch, lifespan 2-3 years.
