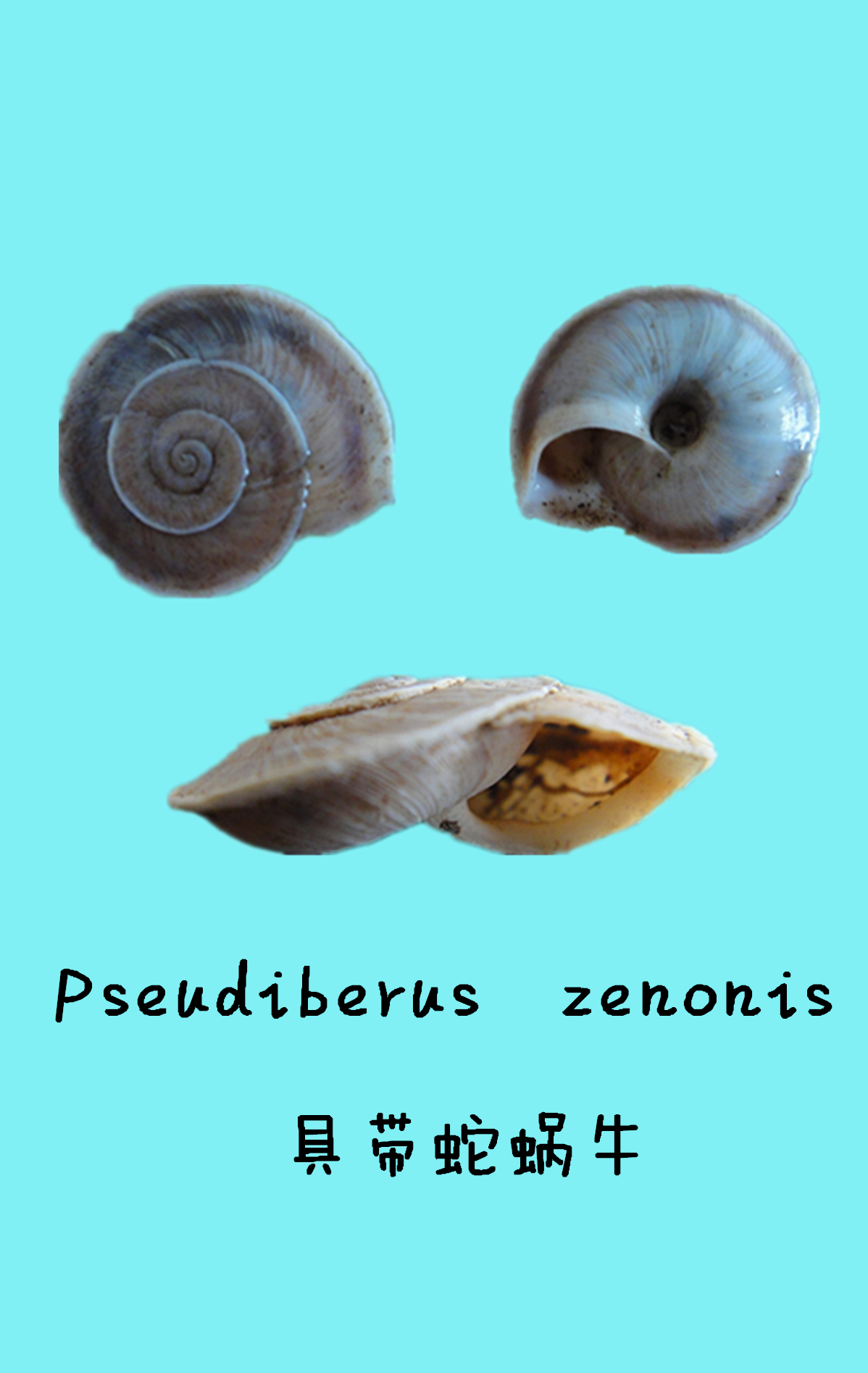

Scientific classification
- Domain: Eukaryota
- Kingdom: Animalia
- Phylum: Mollusca
- Class: Gastropoda
- Order: Stylommatophora
- Family: Camaenidae
- Genus: Pseudiberus
- Species: P. zenonis

Binomial name
- Pseudiberus zenonis Gredler, 1882

= Pseudiberus zenonis =

Species of gastropod

Pseudiberus zenonis is a species of land snail, a terrestrial pulmonate gastropod mollusc in the subfamily Bradybaeninae.

== Description ==
The shell of Pseudiberus zenonis has five whorls. Its height is 7–8 mm, and its diameter is 17–20 mm.

== Habitat and behavior ==
These snails tend to live on steep slopes. They are very active. They eat plants. In winter, they bury themselves in the soil.

== Distribution ==
This species is only found in Shandong, China.
