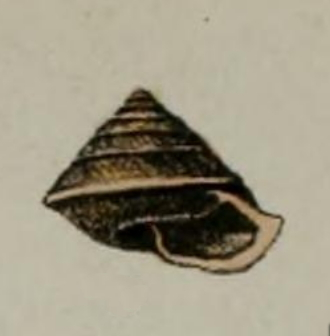
- Shell of Aegista fulvicans (lectotype)

Scientific classification
- Kingdom: Animalia
- Phylum: Mollusca
- Class: Gastropoda
- Order: Stylommatophora
- Family: Camaenidae
- Subfamily: Bradybaeninae
- Tribe: Aegistini
- Genus: Aegista
- Species: A. fulvicans

Binomial name
- Aegista fulvicans (H. Adams, 1866)
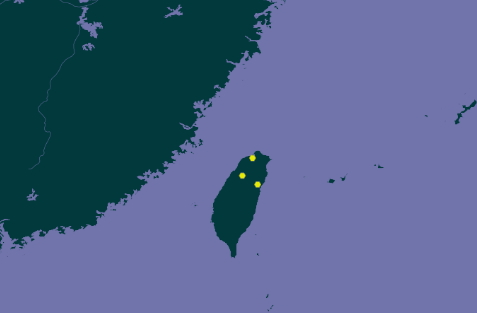

Synonyms
- Aegista (Plectotropis) fulvicans (H. Adams, 1866) (unaccepted combination); Aegista (Plectotropis) fulvicans fulvicans (H. Adams, 1866) alternative representation; Eulota (Plectotropis) fulvicans (H. Adams, 1866) (unaccepted combination); Helix (Plectotropis) fulvicans H. Adams, 1866 (original combination)

= Aegista fulvicans =

Species of gastropod

Aegista fulvicans is a species of air-breathing land snails, a terrestrial pulmonate gastropod in the family Camaenidae.

== Subspecies ==
There are two subspecies:

- Aegista fulvicans browni (Pilsbry & Hirase, 1905)
- Aegista fulvicans fulvicans (H. Adams, 1866)

== Description ==
The diameter of the shell attains 11 mm, its height 9 mm, or based on a later measurement, 14 mm and 9.9 mm, respectively. There are seven whorls.

== Distribution ==
This species is endemic to Taiwan. Its type locality is "Tamsui, Formosa".
