= List of non-marine molluscs of Timor-Leste =

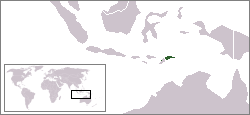
Location of East Timor

The non-marine molluscs of East Timor are a part of the molluscan fauna of East Timor (wildlife of East Timor). A number of species of non-marine molluscs are found in the wild in East Timor.

== Land gastropods ==
Clausiliidae

- Phaedusa ramelauensis Köhler & Mayer, 2016
- Phaedusa angustocostata Köhler & Mayer, 2016

Diplommatinidae

- Diplommatina atauroensis Köhler & Kessner, 2020
- Diplommatina fluminis B. Rensch, 1931
- Palaina ainaro Köhler & Kessner, 2020
- Palaina orelimo Köhler & Kessner, 2020
- Palaina tuba Köhler & Kessner, 2020
- Palaina brandontrani Köhler & Kessner, 2020
- Palaina mutis Greke, 2017

Enidae

- Apoecus apertus (Martens, 1863)
- Apoecus ramelauensis Köhler, Criscione, Burghardt & Kessner, 2016

Camaenidae

- Landouria montana Köhler, Shea & Kessner, 2019
- Landouria timorensis Köhler, Shea & Kessner, 2019
- Landouria winteriana (Pfeiffer, 1842)
- Parachloritis afranio Köhler & Kessner, 2014
- Parachloritis atauroensis Köhler & Kessner, 2014
- Parachloritis baucauensis Köhler & Kessner, 2014
- Parachloritis herculea Köhler & Kessner, 2014
- Parachloritis laritame Köhler & Kessner, 2014
- Parachloritis manuelmendesi Köhler & Kessner, 2014
- Parachloritis mariae (Nobre, 1917)
- Parachloritis mendax (Martens, 1864)
- Parachloritis mundiperdidi Köhler & Kessner, 2014
- Parachloritis newtoni (Nobre, 1917)
- Parachloritis ninokonisi Köhler & Kessner, 2014
- Parachloritis nusatenggarae Köhler & Kessner, 2014
- Parachloritis pseudolandouria Köhler & Kessner, 2014
- Parachloritis ramelau Köhler & Kessner, 2014
- Parachloritis reidi Köhler & Kessner, 2014
- Parachloritis renschi Köhler & Kessner, 2014
- Parachloritis sylvatica Köhler & Kessner, 2014

== See also ==
- List of marine molluscs of East Timor
- List of non-marine molluscs of Indonesia
