= Armandiella =

Scientific classification
- Domain: Eukaryota
- Kingdom: Animalia
- Phylum: Mollusca
- Class: Gastropoda
- Order: Stylommatophora
- Family: Camaenidae
- Subfamily: Bradybaeninae
- Tribe: Bradybaenini
- Genus: Armandiella; Ancey, 1901

Genus of land snails

Armandiella is a genus of gastropods belonging to the family Camaenidae.

Species:

- Armandiella davidi (Deshayes, 1870)
- Armandiella sarelii (Martens, 1867)
