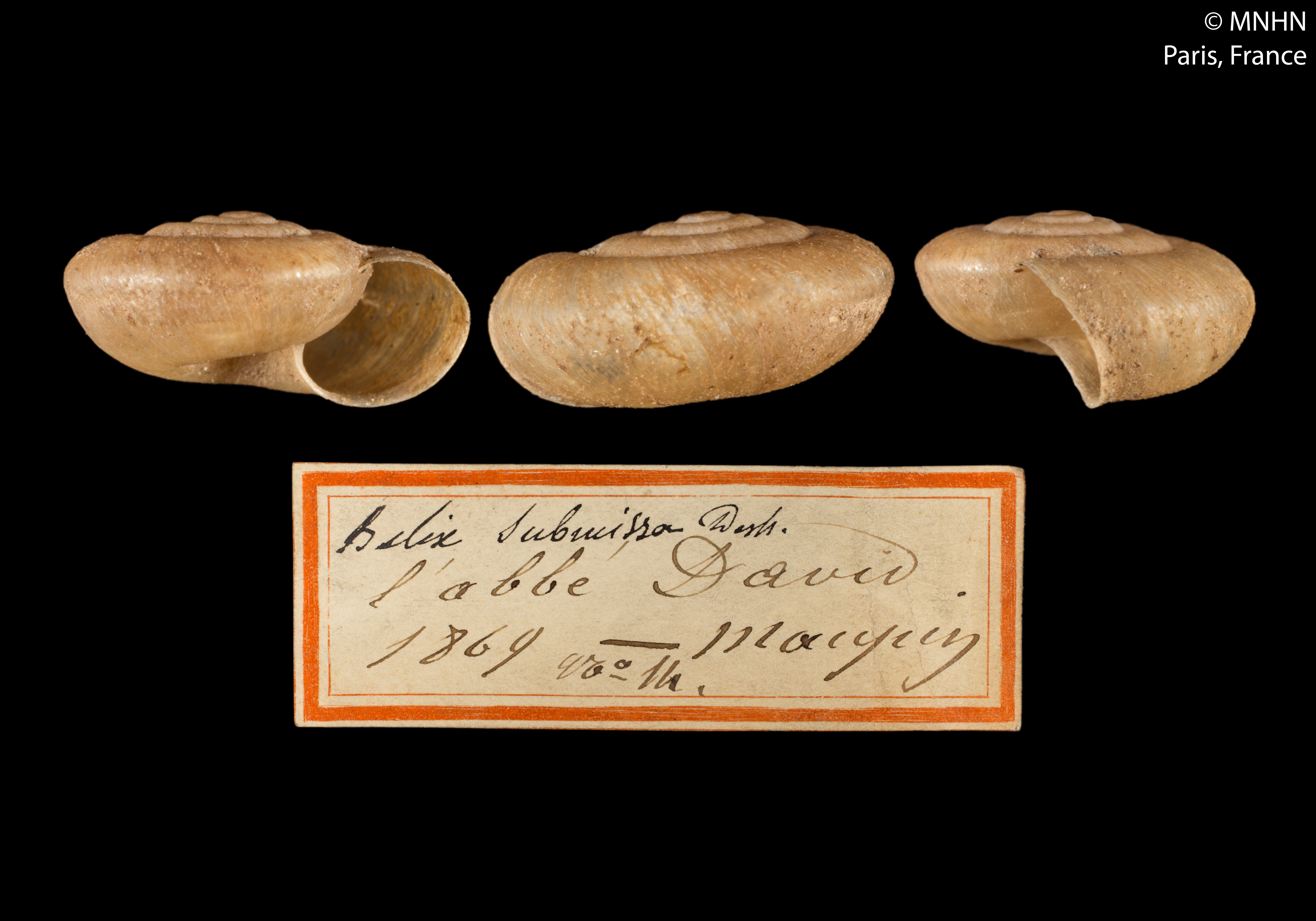
- Shell of Trichobradybaena submissa (syntype at MNHN, Paris)

Scientific classification
- Domain: Eukaryota
- Kingdom: Animalia
- Phylum: Mollusca
- Class: Gastropoda
- Order: Stylommatophora
- Superfamily: Helicoidea
- Family: Camaenidae
- Subfamily: Bradybaeninae
- Genus: Trichobradybaena; M. Wu & J.-Y. Guo, 2003

Type species
- Helix submissa Deshayes, 1874

= Trichobradybaena =

Genus of gastropods

Trichobradybaena is a genus of air-breathing land snails, terrestrial pulmonate gastropod mollusks in the subfamily Bradybaeninae of the family Camaenidae.

== Species ==
- Trichobradybaena chagangensis M. Wu & J.-Y. Guo, 2003
- Trichobradybaena submissa (Deshayes, 1874)
- Trichobradybaena tuberculata M. Wu & J.-Y. Guo, 2003
