= Aegista oldhami =

Scientific classification
- Kingdom: Animalia
- Phylum: Mollusca
- Class: Gastropoda
- Order: Stylommatophora
- Family: Camaenidae
- Subfamily: Bradybaeninae
- Tribe: Aegistini
- Genus: Aegista
- Species: A. oldhami

Binomial name
- Aegista oldhami (W. H. Benson, 1859)

Synonyms
- Aegista (Plectotropis) oldhami (W. H. Benson, 1859) (unaccepted combination); Helix (Plectotropis) oldhami W. H. Benson, 1859 (unaccepted combination); Helix oldhami W. H. Benson, 1859 (original combination); Plectotropis oldhami (W. H. Benson, 1859)

Species of gastropod

Aegista oldhami is a species of air-breathing land snails, a terrestrial pulmonate gastropod in the family Camaenidae.

== Description ==
The diameter of the shell attains 13 mm.

The fairly large, rather thin shell is orbiculately depressed and widely umbilicate. It is greenish brown. The spire is depressedly conoid and has an obtuse apex. The suture is impressed. The shell contains six to seven narrow whorls. These are slowly increasing and subplanulate. The sculpture consists of closed raised striae, that are irregularly oblique and flexuous, and fine decussating spiral lines. The body whorl is shortly and rapidly descending in front and obtusely angulated above the periphery. The aperture is oblique and lunately rounded. The base of the shell is convex and angular around the umbilicus. The thin peristome is a little expanded with the margins approaching.

== Distribution ==
This species occurs in Myanmar and India.
