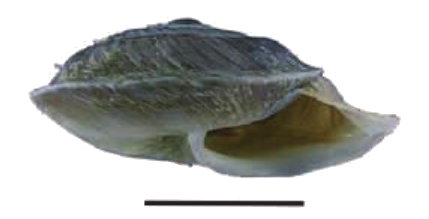
- Pseudiberus chentingensis shell

Scientific classification
- Kingdom: Animalia
- Phylum: Mollusca
- Class: Gastropoda
- Order: Stylommatophora
- Family: Camaenidae
- Tribe: Bradybaenini
- Genus: Pseudiberus; Ancey, 1887

= Pseudiberus =

Genus of gastropods

Pseudiberus is a genus of air-breathing land snails, terrestrial pulmonate gastropod mollusks in the family Camaenidae, inhabiting in Shandong, Henan, Hebei and Shanxi Provinces. Platypetasus Pilsbry, 1894 was previously considered as synonyms of Pseudiberus, however Zhang et al. (2024) corrected it via phylogenetics based on morphology and molecules.

== Taxonomy ==
Two subgenera Pseudiberus and Platypetasus were synonymized in the study published in 2006 by Min Wu and Gang Qi, because their genital characters and their distribution range largely overlap.

== Distribution ==
These terrestrial snails inhabit Eastern Asia.

== Species list ==
Species in the genus Pseudiberus:

- Pseudiberus anderssoni (Odhner, 1925)
- Pseudiberus depressus (Yen, 1935)
- Pseudiberus chentingensis Yen, 1935 - synonym: Pseudiberus cixianensis Chen & Zhang, 2000
- Pseudiberus futtereri (Andreae, 1903)
- Pseudiberus tectumsinense (Martens, 1873) - type species of the genus Pseudiberus
- Pseudiberus zenonis (Gredler, 1882)
- Pseudiberus shanheicus Zhang et al., 2024

== Ecology ==
These snails live under old stones and in forests. They eat plants.
