= Bradybaena wangkai =

Scientific classification
- Domain: Eukaryota
- Kingdom: Animalia
- Phylum: Mollusca
- Class: Gastropoda
- Order: Stylommatophora
- Family: Camaenidae
- Genus: Bradybaena
- Species: B. wangkai

Binomial name
- Bradybaena wangkai X.-L. Sun, Z.-H. Zeng, & J. He, 2017

Species of snail

Bradybaena wangkai is a species of beer snail found in the region of Tibet, China.

== Diet ==
B. wangkai feeds by grazing on detritus, a trait shared by all other species of the infraorder Helicoidei.

== Distribution and habitat ==
B. wangkai is currently known to be found in the Tibetan region in China. This species lives in a terrestrial habitat.
