= Bradybaena acustina =

Scientific classification
- Kingdom: Animalia
- Phylum: Mollusca
- Class: Gastropoda
- Order: Stylommatophora
- Family: Camaenidae
- Genus: Bradybaena
- Species: B. acustina

Binomial name
- Bradybaena acustina Möllendorff, 1899

Synonyms
- Eulota acustina Möllendorff, 1899

Species of snail

Bradybaena acustina is a species of snail native to China.
