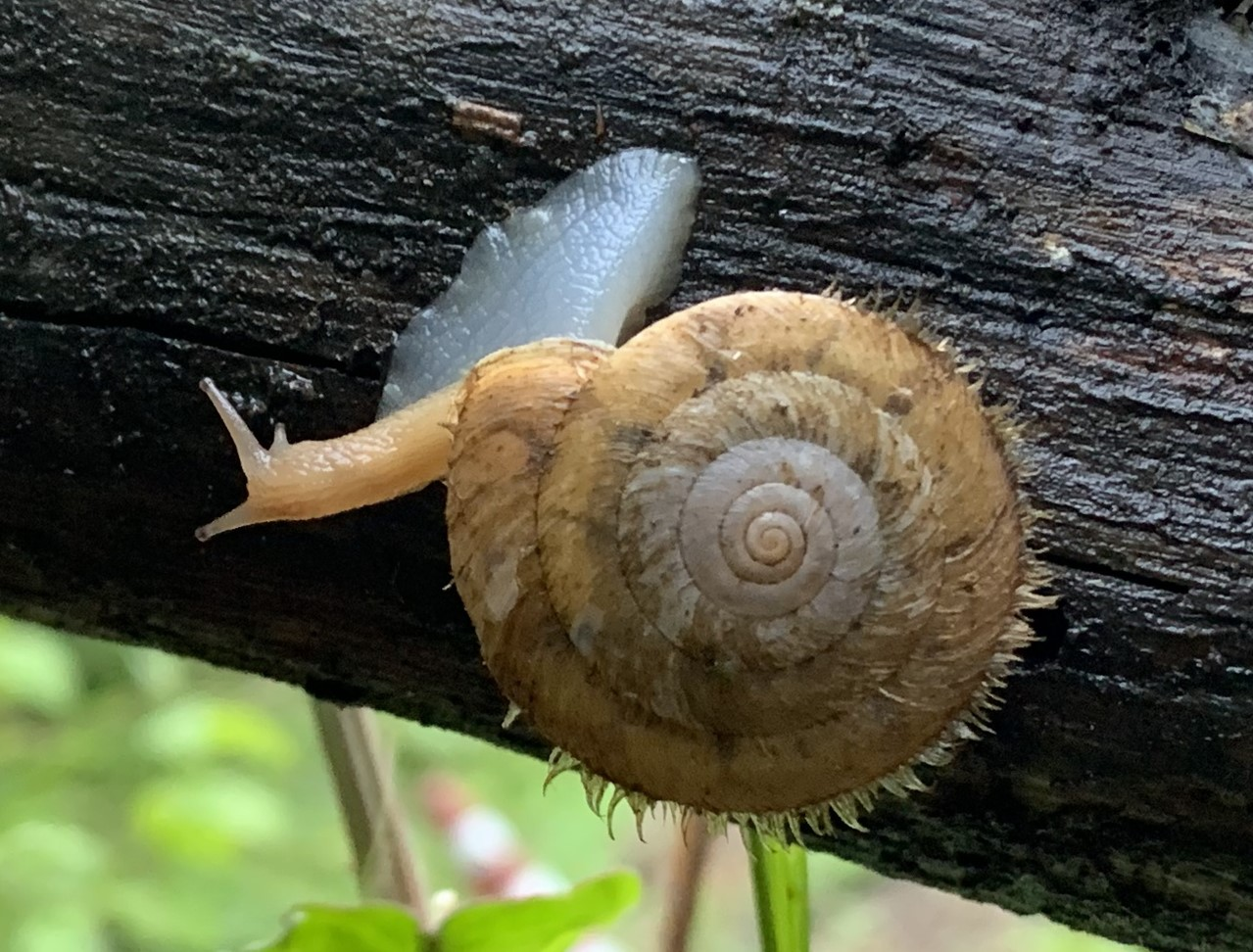

Scientific classification
- Kingdom: Animalia
- Phylum: Mollusca
- Class: Gastropoda
- Order: Stylommatophora
- Family: Camaenidae
- Genus: Plectotropis
- Species: P. vulgivaga

Binomial name
- Plectotropis vulgivaga (Schmacker and Boettger, 1890)

Synonyms
- Eulota (Plectotropis) vulgivaga (Schmacker & O. Boettger, 1890) (unaccepted combination); Eulota vulgivaga (Schmacker & O. Boettger, 1890) (unaccepted combination); Helix mackensii var. vulgivaga Schmacker & O. Boettger, 1890 (original combination and rank)

= Plectotropis vulgivaga =

Species of gastropod

Plectotropis vulgivaga is a species of air-breathing land snail, a terrestrial pulmonate gastropod mollusk in the family Camaenidae.

Snails in this species create and use love darts as part of their mating behavior. The species can host sporocysts of Dicrocoelium

Subspecies

- Plectotropis vulgivaga lanx (Pilsbry, 1902)
- Plectotropis vulgivaga vulgivaga (Schmacker & O. Boettger, 1890)

== Distribution ==
This species of snail is endemic to Japan.
