= Paraegista =

Scientific classification
- Kingdom: Animalia
- Phylum: Mollusca
- Class: Gastropoda
- Order: Stylommatophora
- Family: Camaenidae
- Tribe: Bradybaenini
- Genus: Paraegista; Kuroda & Azuma, 1951

Genus of gastropods

Paraegista is a genus of air-breathing land snails, terrestrial pulmonate gastropod mollusks in the family Camaenidae.

== Species ==
Species within the genus Paraegista include:

- Paraegista apoiensis
