= Bradybaena strictotaenia =

Scientific classification
- Kingdom: Animalia
- Phylum: Mollusca
- Class: Gastropoda
- Order: Stylommatophora
- Family: Camaenidae
- Genus: Bradybaena
- Species: B. strictotaenia

Binomial name
- Bradybaena strictotaenia (Möllendorff, 1899)

Synonyms
- Euhadra stictotaenia von Möllendorff, 1899

Species of land snail

Bradybaena strictotaenia is a species of land snail, a terrestrial gastropod mollusc in the family Camaenidae. It was first described by the German malacologist Otto Franz von Möllendorff in 1899 under the name Euhadra stictotaenia.

== Description ==
The shell is depressed and almost disc-shaped, with a low spire and approximately five and a half whorls. It is relatively thin, with a broad, open umbilicus. Its surface has fine, irregular growth striae and distinct spiral lines, giving it a slightly granular appearance.

The shell is predominantly whitish and bears numerous chestnut-brown bands, many of which are interrupted. A broader, continuous brown band runs along the periphery. The aperture is oblique and nearly circular, with a moderately expanded outer lip.

The specimens measured by Möllendorff had shell diameters ranging from 32 to 34.5 mm (1.26 to 1.36 in) and heights of 14.5 to 16.5 mm (0.57 to 0.65 in).

=== Shell coiling ===
The species is described as normally dextral (right-coiled). In his original account, Möllendorff placed Euhadra stictotaenia under the heading Rechtsgewundene Arten ("right-coiled species"). He distinguished this group from species with both directions of coiling and from those described as sinistral (left-coiled).

The original description does not give a frequency for individuals with reversed shell coiling.

== Distribution ==
Bradybaena strictotaenia is known from western China. Möllendorff recorded specimens from southern Gansu and northern Sichuan, including the area around Wenxian and other localities in Gansu.

== Taxonomy ==
Möllendorff introduced the species in 1899 as Euhadra stictotaenia. The name Bradybaena strictotaenia was subsequently used by T.-C. Yen in 1939. In his 1968 review of the Senckenberg museum's mollusc collection, Adolf Zilch listed the species as Bradybaena stictotaenia and reproduced Yen's spelling strictotaenia with the annotation "[sic]".

The generic placement of the species has also been questioned. A molecular phylogenetic study included it as "Bradybaena" strictotaenia. The results placed the species in a lineage closely related to the type species of Stilpnodiscus, rather than among the core members of Bradybaena. The same study found that several genera of Chinese camaenid land snails may not represent natural evolutionary groups and require further taxonomic revision.
