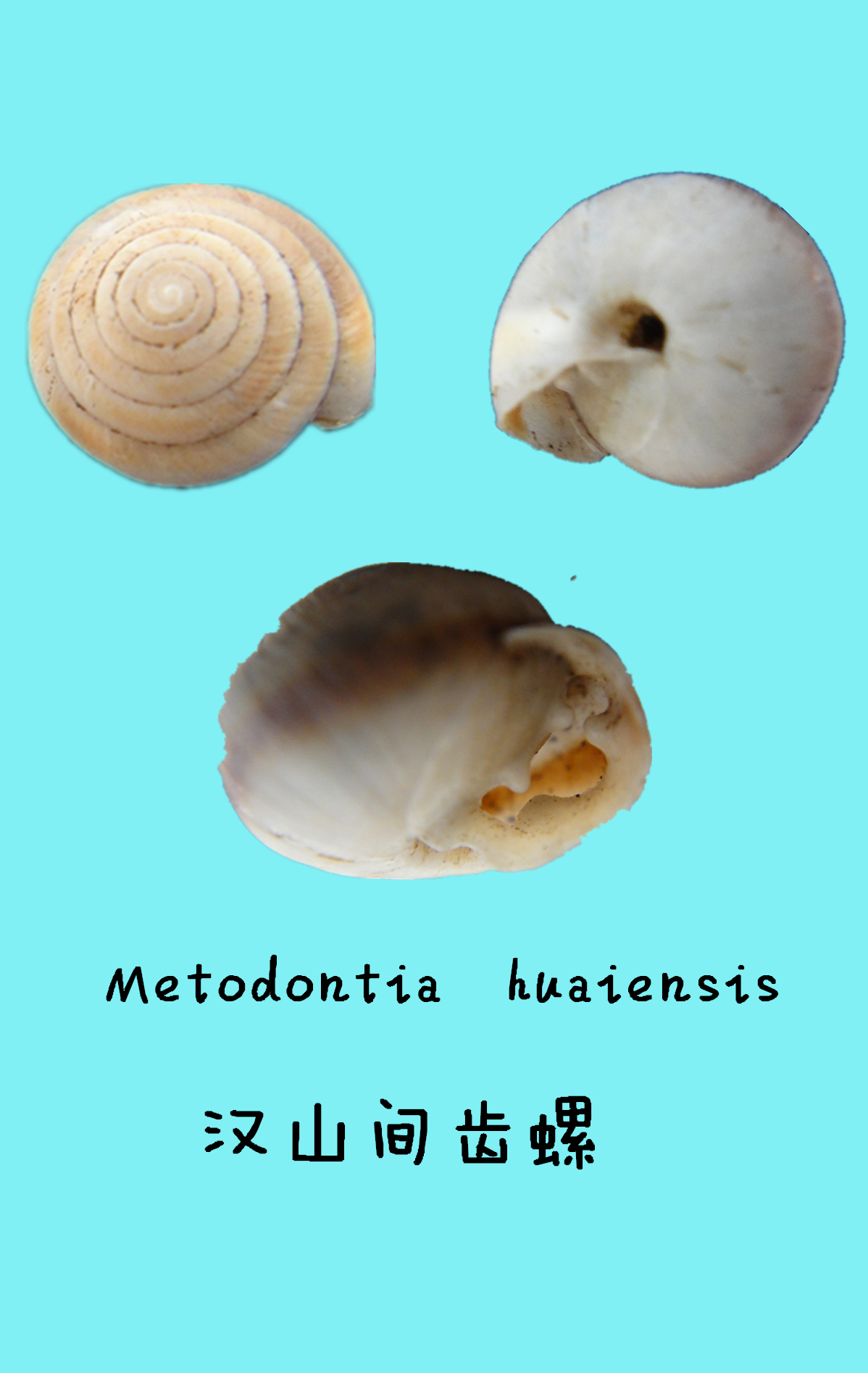
- Metodontia huaiensis

Scientific classification
- Kingdom: Animalia
- Phylum: Mollusca
- Class: Gastropoda
- Order: Stylommatophora
- Family: Camaenidae
- Subfamily: Bradybaeninae
- Genus: Metodontia; Möllendorff, 1886

= Metodontia =

Genus of gastropods

Metodontia is a genus of land snails, terrestrial gastropod mollusks in the family Camaenidae. This genus is considered to be the most primitive of the bradybaenid snails.

== Species list ==
Species within the genus Metodontia include:

- Metodontia beresowskii (Mollendorff, 1899)
- Metodontia griphodes (Sturany, 1901)
- Metodontia huaiensis huaiensis (Crosse, 1882)
- Metodontia huaiensis (Mollendorff, 1886)
- Metodontia yantaiensis yantaiensis (Crosse & Debeaux, 1863)
- Metodontia yantaiensis tetrodon (Mollendorff, 1875)

== Habitat ==
These are terrestrial snails.
