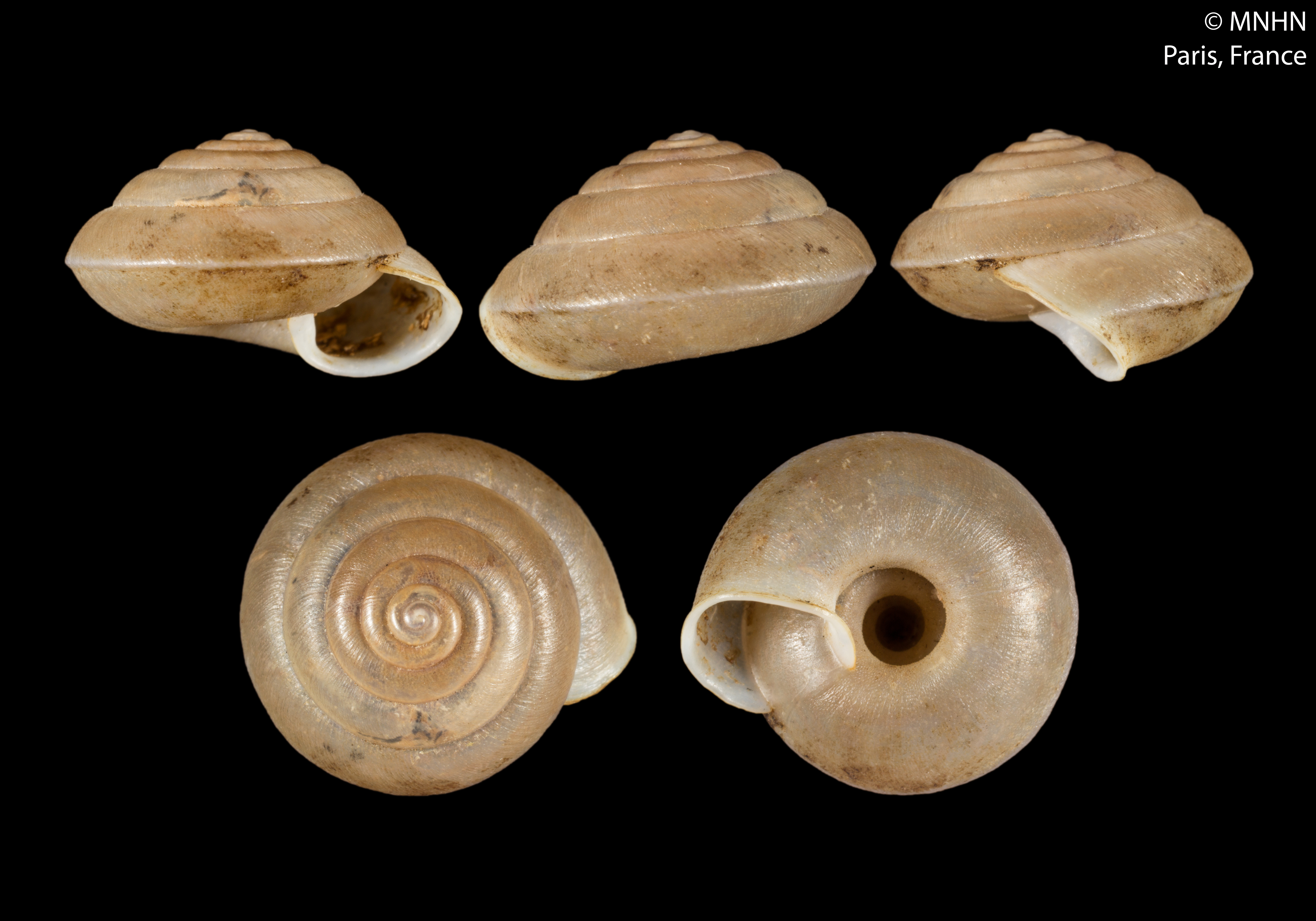
- Shell of Landouria ptychostyla (syntype at MNHN, Paris)

Scientific classification
- Kingdom: Animalia
- Phylum: Mollusca
- Class: Gastropoda
- Order: Stylommatophora
- Family: Camaenidae
- Subfamily: Bradybaeninae
- Tribe: Aegistini
- Genus: Landouria; Godwin-Austen, 1918

Type species
- Helix huttonii L. Pfeiffer, 1842

Synonyms
- Thaitropis Schileyko, 2004

= Landouria =

Genus of gastropods

Landouria is a genus of gastropods that belongs to the subfamily Bradybaeninae of the family Camaenidae. They have a depressed shell and lack a dart apparatus.

== Distribution ==
The species of this genus are found in Southern and Southeastern Asia.

== Species ==
This genus currently contains more than 50 described species. They are listed below:

- Landouria abdidalem Nurinsiyah, Neiber & Hausdorf, 2019
- Landouria aborensis Godwin-Austen, 1918
- Landouria chloritoides Nahok, S. Tumpeesuwan & C. Tumpeesuwan, 2021
- Landouria ciliocincta (Möllendorff, 1897)
- Landouria circinata Nahok, S. Tumpeesuwan & C. Tumpeesuwan, 2021
- Landouria coeni (Peston, 1914)
- Landouria conoidea (Leschke, 1914)
- Landouria damsangensis Godwin-Austen, 1918
- Landouria davini Dharma, 2015
- Landouria dharmai Nurinsiyah, Neiber & Hausdorf, 2019
- Landouria dhaulagirica Schileyko & Kuznetsov, 1998
- Landouria diplogramme (Möllendorff, 1902)
- Landouria elegans Nahok, S. Tumpeesuwan & C. Tumpeesuwan, 2021
- Landouria epiplatia (Möllendorff, 1897)
- Landouria flagellolonga Benchawan Nahok, Utain Chanlabut, Kitti Tanmuangpak, 2026
- Landouria grumulus (Godwin-Austen, 1891)
- Landouria hengdanensis Godwin-Austen, 1918
- Landouria huttonii (L.Pfeiffer, 1842)
- Landouria intha Páll-Gergely, Hunyadi & Hausdorf, 2020
- Landouria intumescens (Martens, 1867)
- Landouria leucochila (Gude, 1905)
- Landouria madurensis Nurinsiyah, Neiber & Hausdorf, 2019
- Landouria menorehensis Nurinsiyah, Neiber & Hausdorf, 2019
- Landouria montana Köhler, Shea & Kessner, 2019
- Landouria monticola van Benthem Jutting, 1950
- Landouria moussoniana (Martens, 1867)
- Landouria naggsi Nurinsiyah, Neiber & Hausdorf, 2019
- Landouria nodifera Nurinsiyah, Neiber & Hausdorf, 2019
- Landouria nusakambangensis Nurinsiyah, Neiber & Hausdorf, 2019
- Landouria omphalostoma Páll-Gergely & Hunyadi, 2013
- Landouria pacitanensis Nurinsiyah, Neiber & Hausdorf, 2019
- Landouria pakidulan Nurinsiyah, Neiber & Hausdorf, 2019
- Landouria parahyangensis Nurinsiyah, Neiber & Hausdorf, 2019
- Landouria petrukensis Nurinsiyah, Neiber & Hausdorf, 2019
- Landouria politocostata B.Rensch, 1934
- Landouria ptychostyla (Martens, 1860)
- Landouria ptychostyloides (Schileyko, 2011)
- Landouria radleyi (Jousseaume, 1894)
- Landouria rhododendronis Schileyko & Kuznetsov, 1998
- Landouria rotatoria (L.Pfeiffer, 1842)
- Landouria savadiensis (G.Nevill, 1877)
- Landouria schepmani (Möllendorff, 1897)
- Landouria sewuensis Nurinsiyah, Neiber & Hausdorf, 2019
- Landouria smimensis (Mousson, 1849)
- Landouria strobiloides C.Tumpeesuwan & S.Tumpeesuwan, 2019
- Landouria sukoliloensis Nurinsiyah, Neiber & Hausdorf, 2019
- Landouria tholiformis Nurinsiyah, Neiber & Hausdorf, 2019
- Landouria timorensis Köhler, Shea & Kessner, 2019
- Landouria tonywhitteni Nurinsiyah, Neiber & Hausdorf, 2019
- Landouria trochomorphoides Nahok, S. Tumpeesuwan & C. Tumpeesuwan, 2021
- Landouria tuberculata Nahok, S. Tumpeesuwan & C. Tumpeesuwan, 2021
- Landouria tumpeesuwanorum Benchawan Nahok, Utain Chanlabut, Kitti Tanmuangpak, 2026
- Landouria winteriana (L.Pfeiffer, 1842)
- Landouria zonifera Nurinsiyah, Neiber & Hausdorf, 2019
