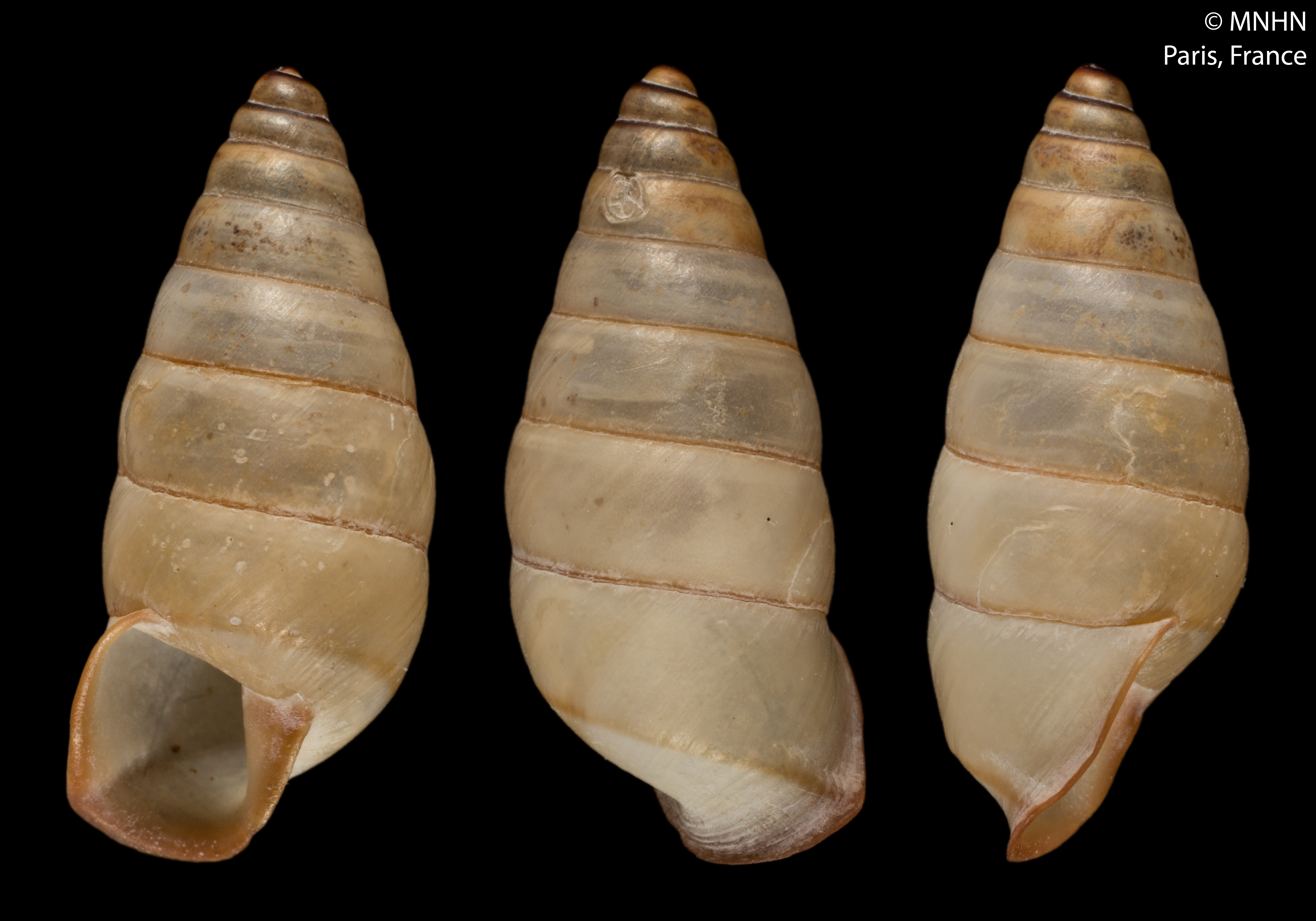
- Shell of Pseudobuliminus maestratii (holotype at MNHN, Paris)

Scientific classification
- Kingdom: Animalia
- Phylum: Mollusca
- Class: Gastropoda
- Order: Stylommatophora
- Superfamily: Helicoidea
- Family: Camaenidae
- Subfamily: Bradybaeninae
- Genus: Pseudobuliminus; Gredler, 1886

Type species
- Helix pseudobuliminus Heude, 1882

Species
- See text

Synonyms
- Buliminopsis Heude, 1890; Buliminopsis (Buliminopsis) Heude, 1890· accepted, alternate representation; Buliminus (Lophauchen) von Möllendorff, 1901 superseded rank; Helix (Buliminopsis) Heude, 1890 (unaccepted rank); Helix (Pseudobuliminus) Gredler, 1886 (original rank); Lophauchen von Möllendorff, 1901 junior subjective synonym; Pseudobuliminus (Pseudobuliminus) Gredler, 1886· accepted, alternate representation

= Pseudobuliminus =

Genus of gastropods

Pseudobuliminus is a genus of air-breathing land snails, terrestrial pulmonate gastropod mollusks in the subfamily Bradybaeninae of the family Camaenidae.

== Species ==
- Pseudobuliminus beijingensis X.-X. Wang, 2025
- Pseudobuliminus buliminoides (Heude, 1882)
- Pseudobuliminus buliminus (Heude, 1882)
- Pseudobuliminus certa (Zilch, 1938)
- Pseudobuliminus conoidius (Heude, 1890)
- Pseudobuliminus cristatellus (von Möllendorff, 1901)
- Pseudobuliminus cylindrus (Möllendorff, 1899)
- Pseudobuliminus dongyiicus Zhang, 2024
- Pseudobuliminus franzhuberi Thach, 2018
- Pseudobuliminus gracilispira (Möllendorff, 1899)
- Pseudobuliminus incertus (L. Pfeiffer, 1866)
- Pseudobuliminus krejcii (Zilch, 1938)
- Pseudobuliminus maestratii Thach, 2017
- Pseudobuliminus meiacoshimensis (A. Adams & Reeve, 1850)
- Pseudobuliminus muleung Choi & Park 2020
- Pseudobuliminus nanchongensis M. Wu, 2002
- Pseudobuliminus obesus Thach & F. Huber, 2018
- Pseudobuliminus ovoideus Thach & F. Huber, 2018
- Pseudobuliminus piligera (Möllendorff, 1899)
- Pseudobuliminus pinguis (Ancey, 1882)
- Pseudobuliminus pseudobuliminus (Heude, 1882)
- Pseudobuliminus quaternarius (Heude, 1890)
- Pseudobuliminus soleniscus (Möllendorff, 1901)
- Pseudobuliminus subcylindrica (Möllendorff, 1899)
- Pseudobuliminus subdoliolum (Haas, 1935)
- Pseudobuliminus takarai (Kuroda, 1960)
- Pseudobuliminus thachi F. Huber, 2018
- Pseudobuliminus turrita (Gude, 1900)
- Pseudobuliminus xihuashida Z.-G. Chen & Z.-Y. Chen, 2025

Synonyms

- Pseudobuliminus incerta (L. Pfeiffer, 1866): synonym of Pseudobuliminus incertus (L. Pfeiffer, 1866) (specific epithet is not in agreement with generic name)
- Pseudobuliminus obesa Thach & F. Huber, 2018: synonym of Pseudobuliminus obesus Thach & F. Huber, 2018 (wrong gender agreement of specific epithet)
- Pseudobuliminus rhombostoma (L. Pfeiffer, 1861): synonym of Anceyoconcha rhombostoma (L. Pfeiffer, 1861)
