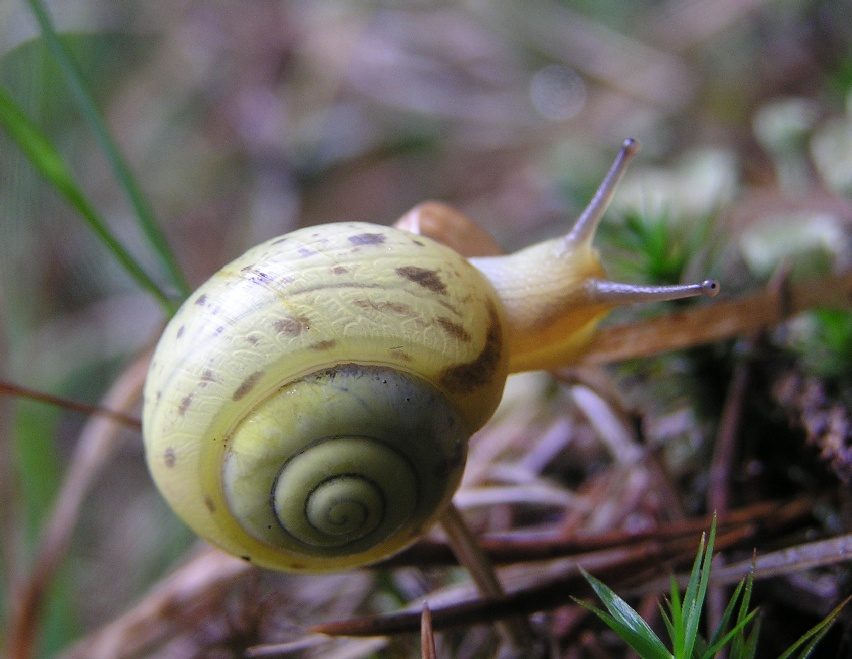
- Fruticicola fruticum

Scientific classification
- Domain: Eukaryota
- Kingdom: Animalia
- Phylum: Mollusca
- Class: Gastropoda
- Order: Stylommatophora
- Family: Camaenidae
- Subfamily: Bradybaeninae
- Tribe: Bradybaenini
- Genus: Fruticicola; Held, 1838

Type species
- Helix fruticum Müller, 1774

Synonyms
- Eulota Hartmann, 1841; Helix (Eulota) W. Hartmann, 1841 (unaccepted rank); Helix (Fruticicola) Held, 1838 (considered a separate genus); Hygromia (Fruticicola) Held, 1838 (considered as a separate genus); Kaznakoviella Lindholm, 1922; Koreanohadra Kuroda & Habe, 1949; Virginihelix Kuroda & Habe, 1949

= Fruticicola =

Genus of gastropods

Fruticicola is a genus of medium-sized, air-breathing land snails, which are terrestrial molluscs in the tribe Bradybaenini of the subfamily Bradybaeninae in the family Camaenidae.

Species of snail in this genus create and use love darts prior to mating.

== Species ==
Species within this genus include:

- Fruticicola alaica (Kuznetsov, 1998)
- Fruticicola almaatini (Skvortzov, 1940)
- Fruticicola bilaticincta (E. v. Martens, 1882)
- Fruticicola boevi (Uvalieva, 1967)
- Fruticicola cavimargo (E. v. Martens, 1879)
- Fruticicola dichrozona (E. v. Martens, 1885)
- Fruticicola fedtschenkoi (E. v. Martens, 1874)
- Fruticicola fruticum (Müller, 1774)
- Fruticicola helvola (Frivaldszky in L. Pfeiffer, 1853)
- Fruticicola intermedia (Rymzhanov, 1983)
- Fruticicola koreana (L. Pfeiffer, 1850)
- Fruticicola lantzi Lindholm, 1927
- Fruticicola perlucens (Rosen, 1901)
- Fruticicola phaeozona (E. v. Martens, 1874)
- Fruticicola plectotropis (E. v. Martens, 1864)
- Fruticicola schrenkii (Middendorff, 1851)
- Fruticicola scythica (Westerlund, 1898)
- Fruticicola sinistrorsa (Tzvetkov, 1938)
- Fruticicola skwortzowi Tzvetkov, 1940
- Fruticicola squamulosa (Izzatullaev & Schileyko, 1980)
- Fruticicola stoliczkana (Nevill, 1878)
- Fruticicola tomyris Lindholm, 1927
- Fruticicola transbaicalica (Schileyko, 1978)
- Fruticicola tzwetkovi (Uvalieva & Soboleva, 1973)
- Fruticicola zhecseni (Rymzhanov, 1979)
