= Plectotropis inexpectata =

Conservation status
- Data Deficient (IUCN 2.3)

Scientific classification
- Kingdom: Animalia
- Phylum: Mollusca
- Class: Gastropoda
- Order: Stylommatophora
- Family: Camaenidae
- Genus: Plectotropis
- Species: P. inexpectata

Binomial name
- Plectotropis inexpectata (Kuroda & Minato, 1977)

Synonyms
- Aegista (Plectotropis) inexpectata Kuroda & Minato, 1977

Species of gastropod

Plectotropis inexpectata is a species of air-breathing land snail, a terrestrial pulmonate gastropod mollusk in the family Camaenidae. This species is endemic to Japan.
