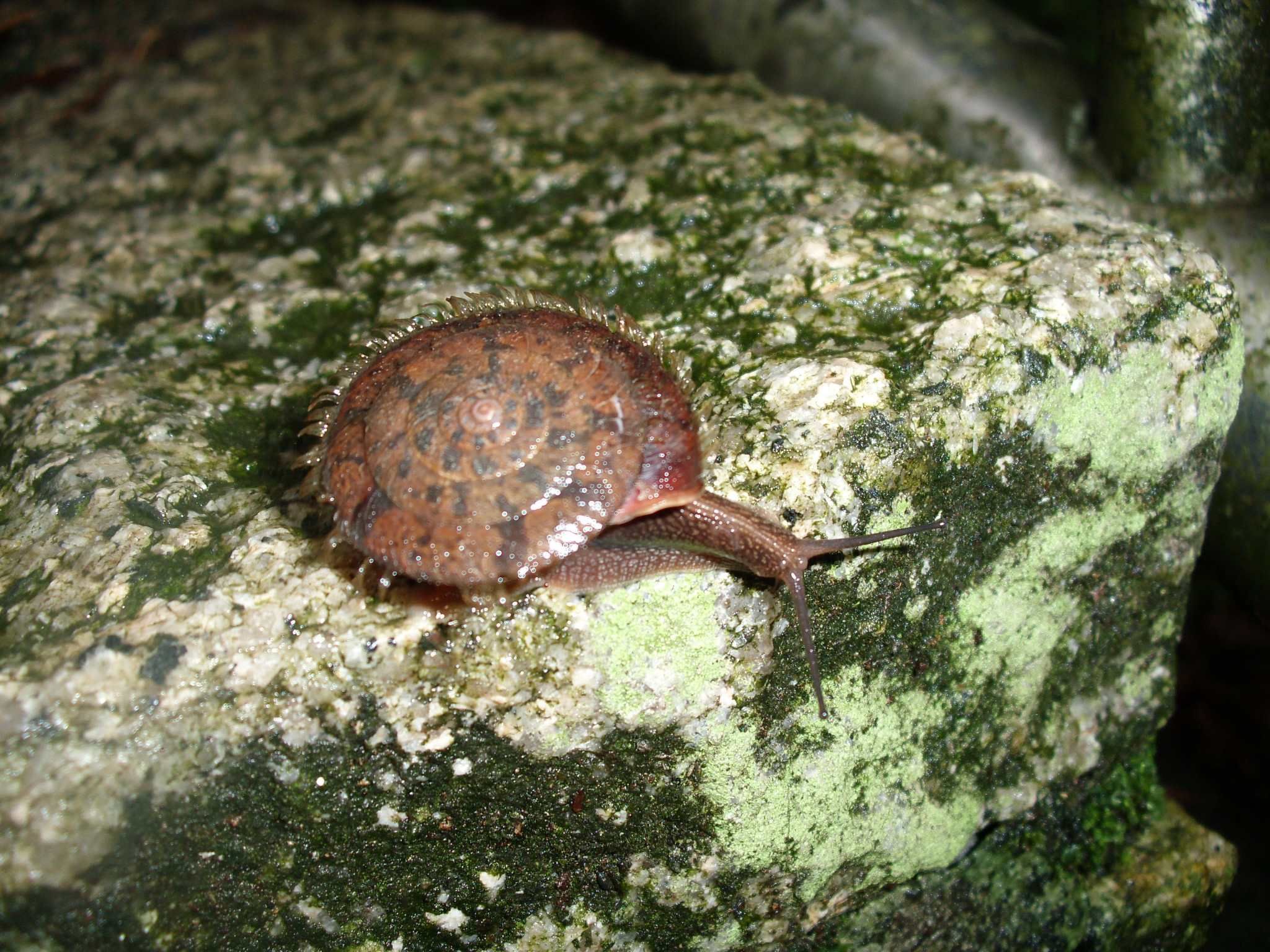

Scientific classification
- Kingdom: Animalia
- Phylum: Mollusca
- Class: Gastropoda
- Order: Stylommatophora
- Family: Camaenidae
- Genus: Plectotropis
- Species: P. mackensii

Binomial name
- Plectotropis mackensii (Adams & Reeve, 1850)

Synonyms
- Aegista (Plectotropis) mackensii (Adams & Reeve, 1850) (unaccepted combination); Aegista mackensii (Adams & Reeve, 1850) (unaccepted combination); Eulota (Plectotropis) mackensii (Adams & Reeve, 1850); Eulota (Plectotropis) mackensii var. formosa Pilsbry, 1902 (junior synonym); Eulota mackensii (Adams & Reeve, 1850); Helix (Plectotropis) mackensii Adams & Reeve, 1850 (unaccepted combination)

= Plectotropis mackensii =

Species of gastropod

Plectotropis mackensii is a species of air-breathing land snail, a terrestrial pulmonate gastropod mollusk in the family Camaenidae.

This species is endemic to Taiwan.
