= Paraegista apoiensis =

Conservation status
- Data Deficient (IUCN 2.3)

Scientific classification
- Kingdom: Animalia
- Phylum: Mollusca
- Class: Gastropoda
- Order: Stylommatophora
- Family: Camaenidae
- Genus: Paraegista
- Species: P. apoiensis

Binomial name
- Paraegista apoiensis Habe, 1970

Species of gastropod

Paraegista apoiensis is a species of air-breathing land snails, terrestrial pulmonate gastropod mollusks in the family Camaenidae. This species is endemic to Japan.
