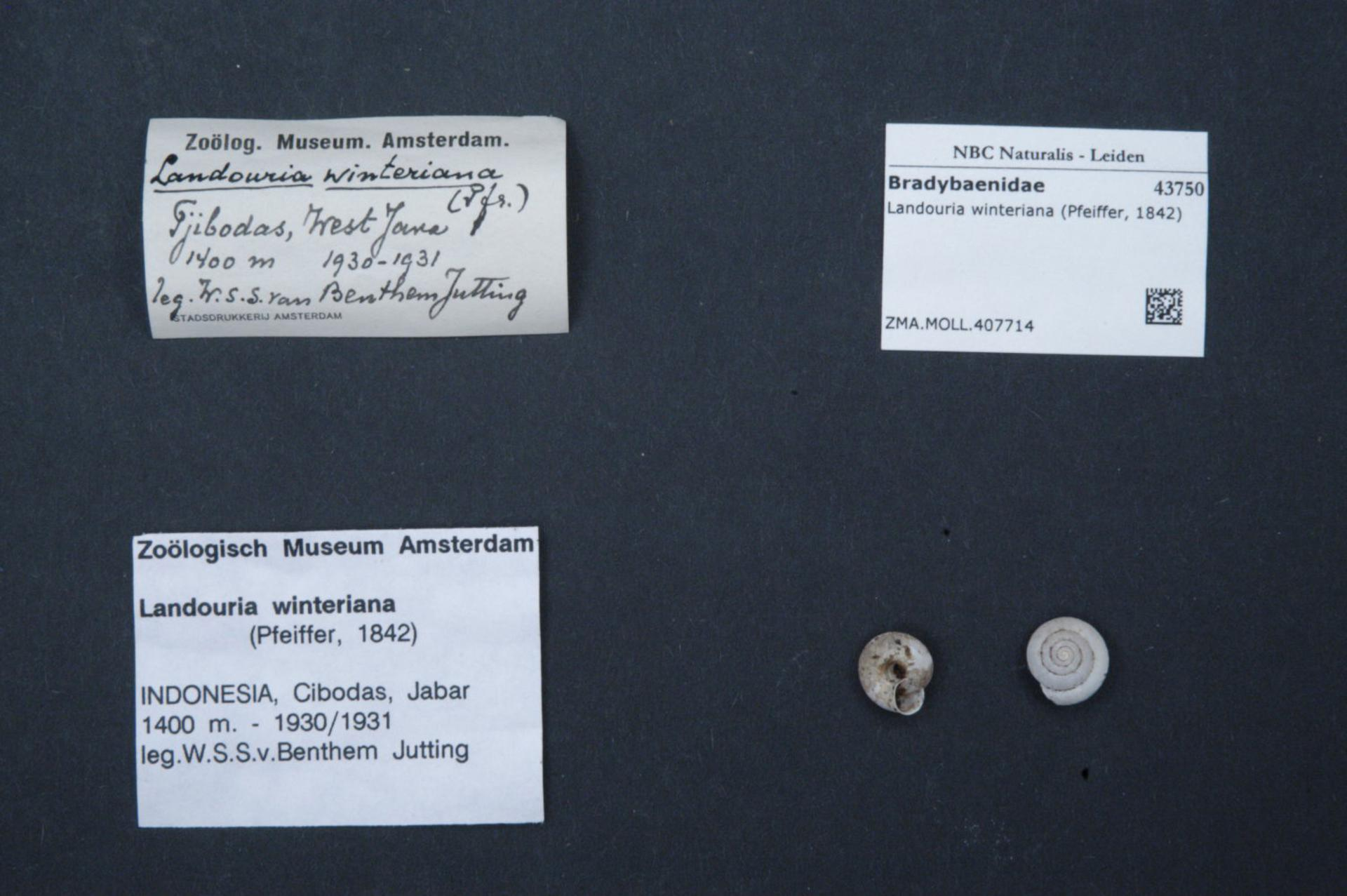

Scientific classification
- Kingdom: Animalia
- Phylum: Mollusca
- Class: Gastropoda
- Order: Stylommatophora
- Family: Camaenidae
- Genus: Landouria
- Species: L. winteriana

Binomial name
- Landouria winteriana (Pfeiffer, 1842)

= Landouria winteriana =

Species of gastropod

Landouria winteriana is a species of gastropods belonging to the family Camaenidae.

The species is found in Malesia.
