= De Morgan =

De Morgan or de Morgan is a surname, and may refer to:

- Augustus De Morgan (1806–1871), British mathematician and logician
  - De Morgan's laws (or De Morgan's theorem), a set of rules from propositional logic
  - The De Morgan Medal, a triennial mathematics prize awarded by the London Mathematical Society
- Campbell De Morgan (1811–1876), British surgeon
- Evelyn De Morgan (1855–1919), English pre-Raphaelite painter
- Jacques de Morgan (1857–1924), French archaeologist
- Mary De Morgan (1850–1907), English author of literary fairytales
- William De Morgan (1839–1917), English designer, potter, ceramics-worker, and novelist
