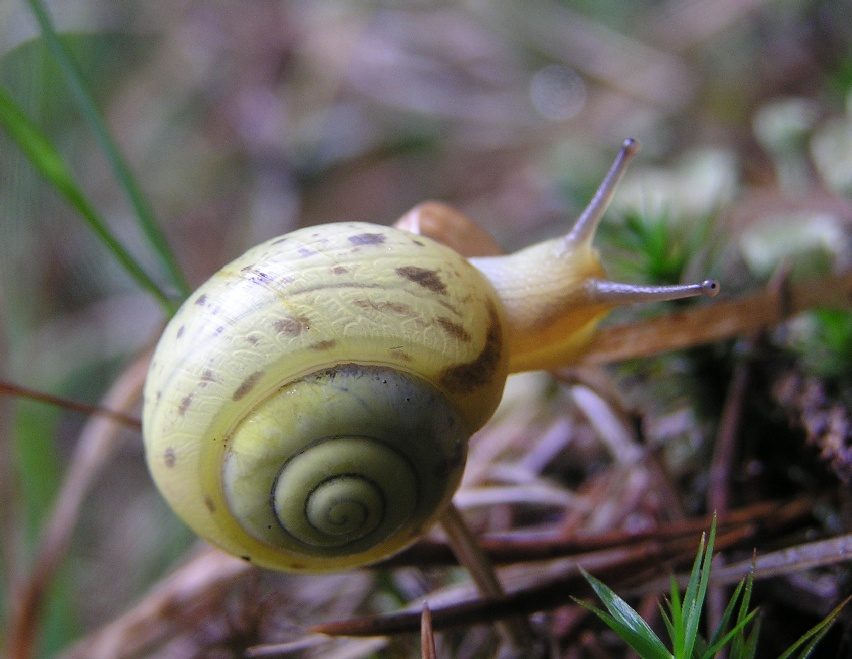

Conservation status
- Least Concern (IUCN 3.1)

Scientific classification
- Kingdom: Animalia
- Phylum: Mollusca
- Class: Gastropoda
- Order: Stylommatophora
- Family: Camaenidae
- Subfamily: Bradybaeninae
- Tribe: Bradybaenini
- Genus: Fruticicola
- Species: F. fruticum

Binomial name
- Fruticicola fruticum (O. F. Müller, 1774)

Synonyms
- Bradybaena (Bradybaena) fruticum (Müller, 1774); Helix fruticum Müller, 1774

= Fruticicola fruticum =

Species of gastropod

Fruticicola fruticum is a species of medium-sized, air-breathing land snail, a terrestrial pulmonate gastropod mollusc in the family Camaenidae.

== Shell description ==
The shell of this species is globular with a deep umbilicus. The shell color is whitish or brownish.

The maximum shell dimension is about 22 millimetres (0.87 in).

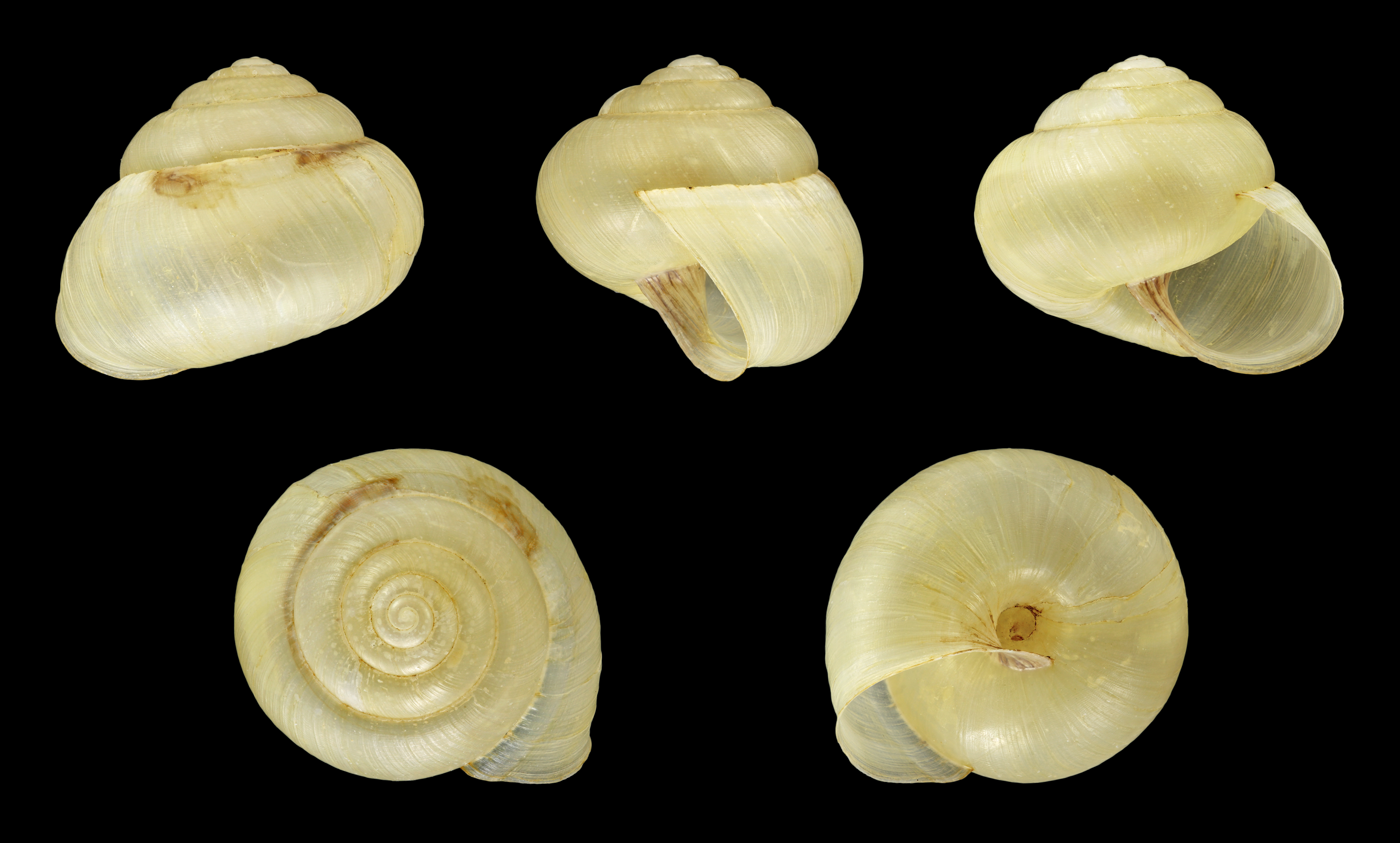
Shell

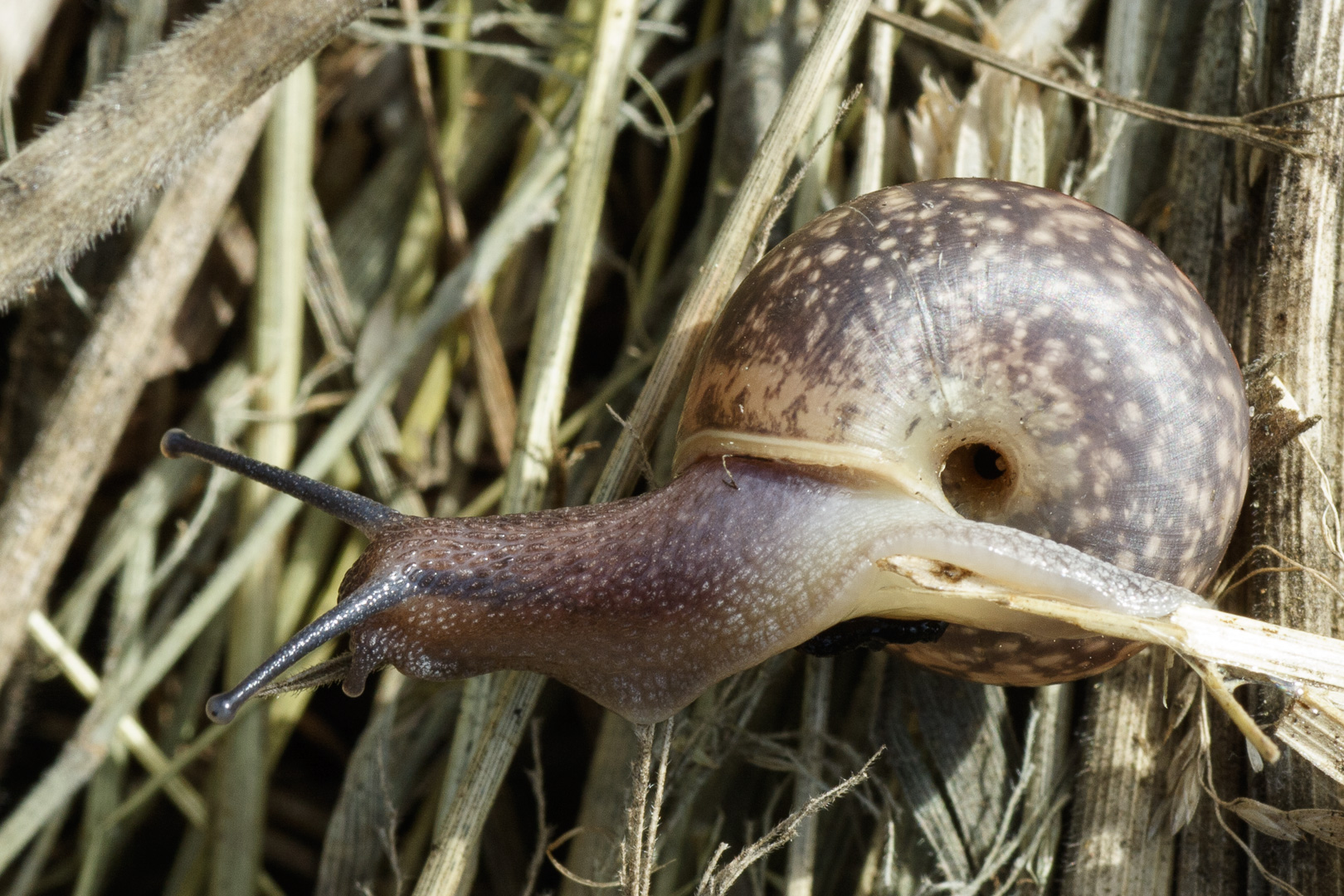
The umbilicus

== Distribution ==
Europe (until recently including the southeastern part of British Isles, where it was probably introduced.)

- Austria
- Bulgaria
- Czech Republic - least concern (LC)
- Germany
- Great Britain - extinct
- Netherlands
- Poland
- Romania
- Serbia
- Finland
- Slovakia
- Ukraine

== Life cycle ==
The size of the egg is 1.9 millimetres (0.075 in).

This species of snail makes and uses love darts during mating.
