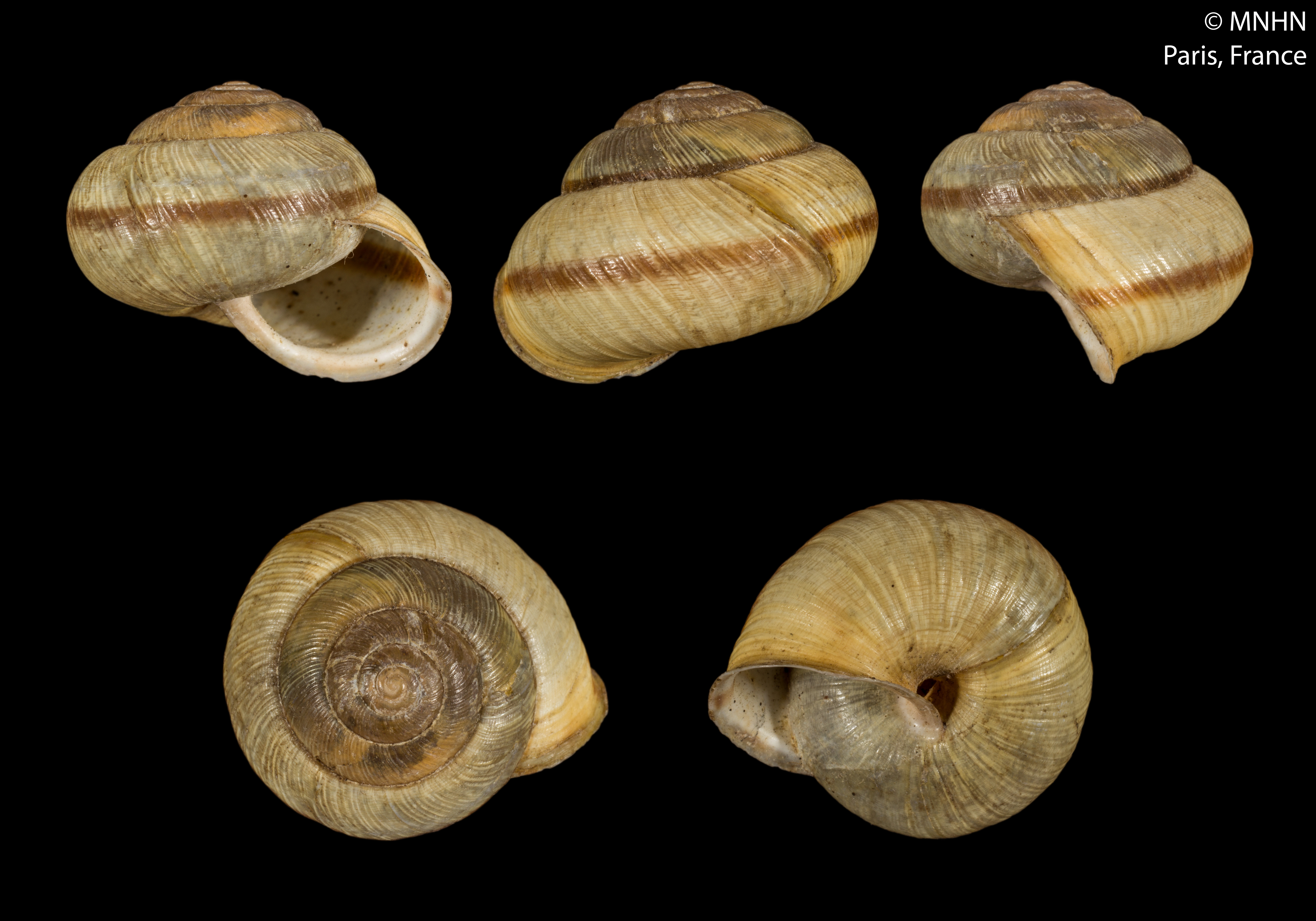
- Various views of the shell of B. bocageana

Scientific classification
- Domain: Eukaryota
- Kingdom: Animalia
- Phylum: Mollusca
- Class: Gastropoda
- Order: Stylommatophora
- Family: Camaenidae
- Genus: Bradybaena
- Species: B. bocageana

Binomial name
- Bradybaena bocageana Crosse, 1864

Synonyms
- Bradybaena bocageana urupensis Pilsbry, 1927; Helix bocageana Crosse, 1864; Karaftohelix bocageana Crosse, 1864; Karaftohelix bocageana urupensis Pilsbry, 1927

= Bradybaena bocageana =

Species of snail

Bradybaena bocageana is a species of beer snail native to the country of Laos. This species is terrestrial and known to live in hot springs.
