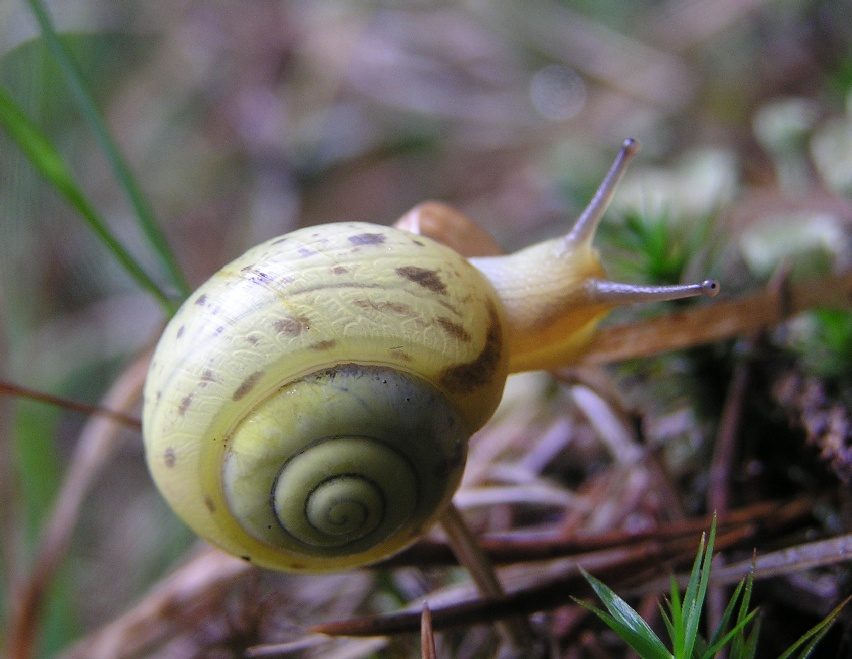
- Fruticicola fruticum

Scientific classification
- Kingdom: Animalia
- Phylum: Mollusca
- Class: Gastropoda
- Order: Stylommatophora
- Family: Camaenidae
- Subfamily: Bradybaeninae; Pilsbry, 1934 (1898)

Genera
- See text

= Bradybaeninae =

Subfamily of gastropods

Bradybaeninae is a taxonomic subfamily of medium-sized to small land snails, terrestrial pulmonate gastropod mollusks in the family Camaenidae. Members of the subfamily Bradybaeninae are defined by the presence of two divided glands with one to two accessory sacs.

== Description ==
Some genera of snails in this subfamily create and use love darts as part of their mating behavior. The dart sac contains one to two glands. They are also defined by missing a diverticulum.

In this subfamily, the number of haploid chromosomes present lies between 26 and 30.

== Distribution ==
Species of the subfamily Bradybaeninae are found mainly in Asia, with only one species, Fruticicola fruticum, occurring in north-western Europe.

== Taxonomy ==
The name of both the subfamily and the genus Bradybaena are derived from the Greek words bradus (= slow) and baino (= walk), meaning "slow walker".

Formerly considered as a separate family, molecular phylogenetic studies from 2007 showed that bradybaenids were closely related with the Camaenidae, a family that they are now considered a subfamily of. In these studies both Bradybaenidae and Camaenidae are mutually polyphyletic, and together form a monophyletic group. This finding suggested that the distinction between the clades was based essentially on the absence (Camaenidae) or presence (Bradybaenidae) of a diverticulum, and was arbitrary. This anatomical structure was apparently lost (or was gained) in several groups in convergence and is therefore not suitable for the delimitation of natural groups.

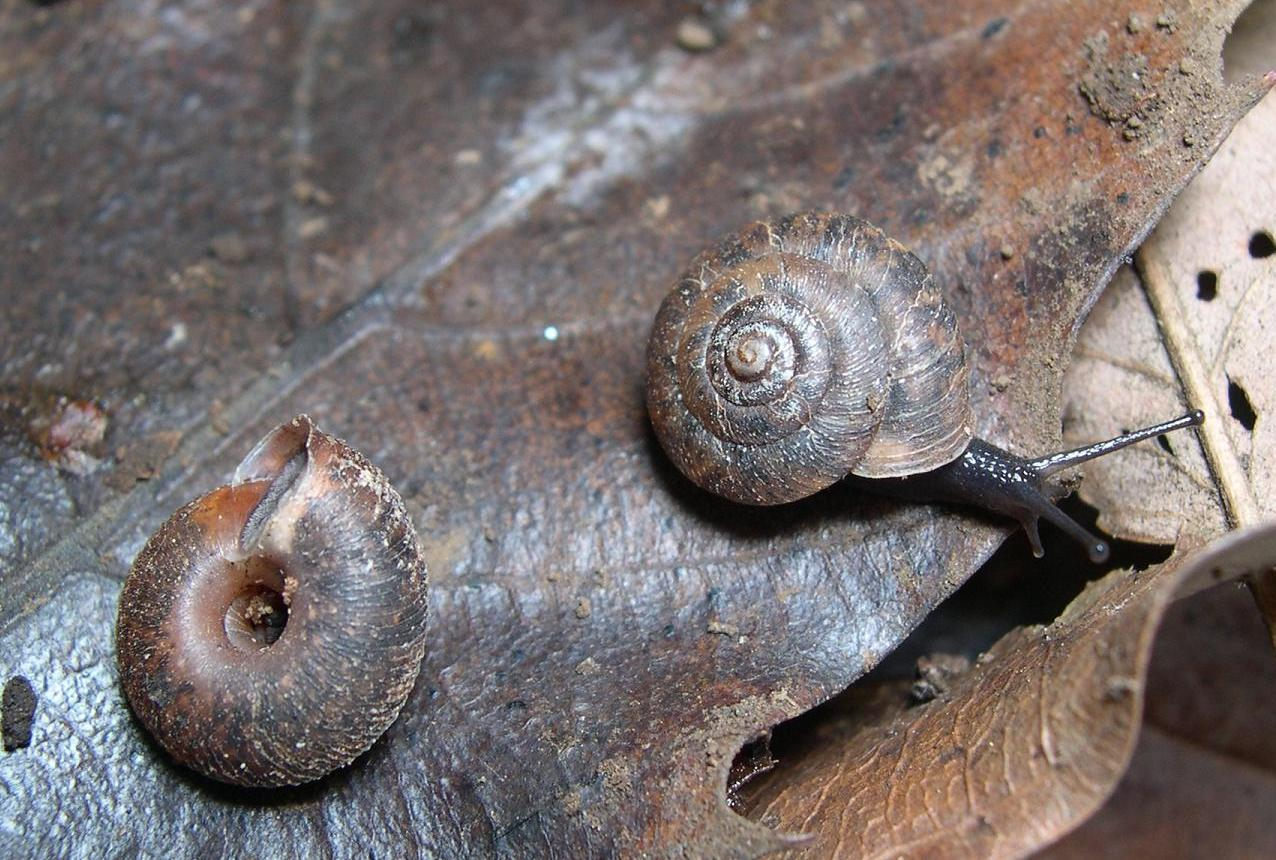
Two live individuals of Aegista tokyoensis, one retracted and one active

The following genera are recognized in the subfamily Bradybaeninae:

- Tribe Aegistini Kuroda & Habe, 1949
  - Aegista Albers, 1850
  - Aegistohadra M. Wu, 2004
  - Coelorus Pilsbry, 1900
  - Dolicheulota Pilsbry, 1901
  - Guamampa Schileyko, 1997
  - Landouria Godwin-Austen, 1918
  - Lepidopisum Kuroda & Habe, 1958
  - Mandarina Pilsbry, 1895
  - Mastigeulota Pilsbry, 1895
  - Miyakoia Minato, 1980
  - Neoaegista Azuma, 1955
  - Neochloritis Minato, 1982
  - Nesiohelix Kuroda & Emura, 1943
  - Nipponochloritis Habe, 1955
  - Pancala Kuroda & Habe, 1949
  - Plecteulota Möllendorff, 1892
  - Plectotropis E. von Martens, 1860
  - Pseudaspasita Möllendorff, 1901
  - Satsuma A. Adams, 1868
  - Takasagohadra Kuroda, 1941
  - Torobaena F. Haas, 1935
  - Tricheulota Pilsbry, 1895
  - Trishoplita Jacobi, 1898
  - Yakuchloritis Habe, 1955
- Tribe Euhadrini Habe, Okutani & Nishiwaki, 1994
  - Euhadra Pilsbry, 1890
- Tribe Bradybaenini Pilsbry, 1934
  - Acusta E. von Martens, 1860
  - Ainohelix Kuroda & Taki, 1933
  - Apatetes Gude, 1914
  - Armandiella Ancey, 1901
  - Bradybaena H. Beck, 1837
  - Buliminidius Heude, 1890
  - Cathaica Moellendorff, 1884
  - Chosenelix Pilsbry, 1927
  - Coccoglypta Pilsbry, 1895
  - Ezohelix Kuroda & Emura, 1938
  - Fruticicola Held, 1838
  - Grabauia Yen, 1935
  - Karaftohelix Pilsbry, 1927
  - Kugitangia Schileyko, Pazilov & Abdulazizova, 2017
  - Laeocathaica Moellendorff, 1899
  - Metodontia Möllendorff, 1886
  - Mikiria Godwin-Austen, 1918
  - Neofruticicola Schileyko, Pazilov & Abdulazizova, 2020
  - Neseulota Ehrmann, 1911
  - Paraegista Kuroda & Azuma, 1951
  - Phaeohelix Kuroda & Habe, 1949
  - Platypetasus Pilsbry, 1895
  - Pliocathaica Andreae, 1900
  - Ponsadenia Schileyko, 1978
  - Pseudiberus Ancey, 1887
  - Pseudobuliminus Gredler, 1886
  - Rudens Heude, 1890
  - Secusana Gredler, 1894
  - Semibuliminus Möllendorff, 1899
  - Stenogyropsis Möllendorff, 1899
  - Stilpnodiscus Möllendorff, 1899
  - Trichobradybaena M. Wu & J.-Y. Guo, 2003
  - Trichocathaica Gude, 1919
- Genera not placed to tribe:
  - Eueuhadra M. Wu, 2004
  - Jiaoliaous G. Zhang, 2024
  - Sinochloritis M. Wu & Z.-Y. Chen, 2019
  - Sinorachis M. Wu & Z.-Y. Chen, 2019
  - Traumatophora Ancey, 1887
