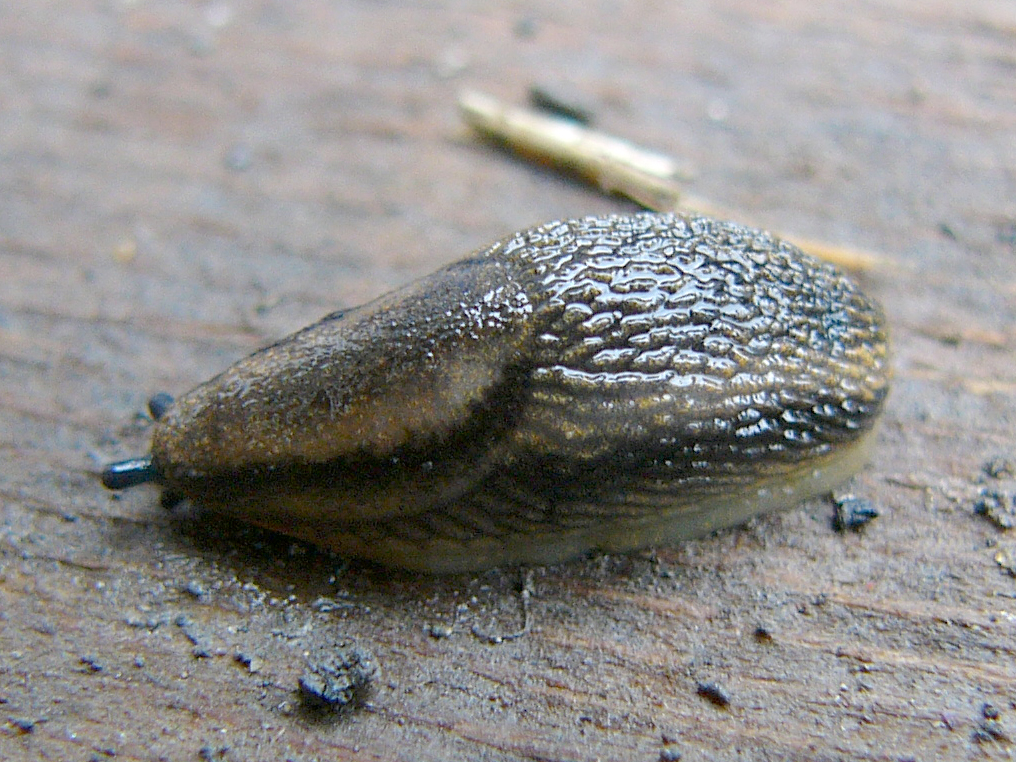
- Arion distinctus from the Czech Republic

Conservation status
- Least Concern (IUCN 3.1)

- Secure (NatureServe)

Scientific classification
- Kingdom: Animalia
- Phylum: Mollusca
- Class: Gastropoda
- Order: Stylommatophora
- Family: Arionidae
- Genus: Arion
- Species: A. distinctus

Binomial name
- Arion distinctus Mabille, 1868

Synonyms
- Arion (Kobeltia) distinctus Mabille, 1868 alternative representation; Arion hortensis A. Férussac, 1819 in part; Arion hortensis A. Férussac, 1819 form A sensu Davies, 1977; Further synonyms: Arion (Kobeltia) vejdowskyi Babor & Koštál, 1893; Arion (Microarion) vejdowskyi Babor & Koštál, 1893; Arion coerulens Collinge, 1897; Arion cottianus Pollonera, 1889; Arion hessei Simroth, 1894; Arion intermedius var. apennina Pollonera, 1889; Arion minimus Simroth, 1885; Arion mollerii Pollonera, 1889; Arion vejdovskyi Babor & Koštál, 1893; Arion vejdowskyi Babor & Koštál, 1893; Geomalacus bourguignati Mabille, 1867 junior subjective synonym; Geomalacus hiemalis Drouët, 1867; Geomalacus mabillei Baudon, 1868; Geomalacus vendeanus A. Letourneux, 1869

= Arion distinctus =

Species of gastropod

Showing the yellow sole

Arion distinctus is a species of air-breathing land slug in the family Arionidae, sometimes known as the roundback slugs. It is a terrestrial pulmonate gastropod mollusc. Several vernacular names exist, but it is unclear if they are much in use: brown soil slug, common garden slug, darkface arion, Mabille's orange-soled slug, April slug.

== Taxonomic background ==
Arion hortensis was described by Férussac in 1819. Only in the 1970s did the amateur malacologist Stella Davies discover that in Britain that name had been applied to three distinct species. Later the name Arion distinctus was used for the one of these species that Davies had provisionally called "form A". Mabille's original 1868 description of A. distinctus included details (colouration, date of collection) that tended to indicate this species rather than Arion hortensis s.s. No type survived, so a neotype has been designated, collected from the same rough locality (near Sèvres, Paris).

== Identification ==
As in other members of the genus Arion, the pneumostome is in the anterior half of the mantle. Arion distinctus never gets bigger than about 4 cm extended. In contrast with members of the subgenus Carinarion (e.g. Arion circumscriptus), there is no dorsal line of pale tubercles suggesting a keel and the shape of the body in cross-section is a segment of a circle rather than a bell shape. Arion distinctus lacks the prickly tubercles of A. intermedius, and is larger and darker with prominent lateral bands. Arion subfuscus and A. fuscus can look similar to A. distinctus when preserved, but these species in life have bright orange mucus on the body and a pale sole, whereas in A. distinctus the sole appears yellow or orange from the sole mucus, but the body mucus is not coloured.

However, reliable discrimination from other members of the subgenus Kobeltia is not always straightforward on external characters. In much of Western Europe the Kobeltia species most likely to be confused is A. hortensis; mixed populations often occur. Authorities differ in their advice on how reliably the two species can be separated using external characters when alive. Useful indications are that A. distinctus has dark tentacles without the red or violet tinge typical of A. hortensis, the general appearance of its back is yellower or browner than in A. hortensis, the row of tubercles directly above the sole is not as white as is typical of A. hortensis, and (least reliably) the lateral bands tend to be lower, running through the pneumostome rather than above. If dissection reveals a two-partite oviduct, one can be sure of A. distinctus, but in most regions a sizeable proportion of individuals have a three-partite oviduct like that of A. hortensis. The definitive character, distinguishing A. distinctus from all other Kobeltia species, is a conical structure inside the atrium that covers the entrance to the epiphallus, but it is not developed in juveniles. The structure is involved in receiving the partner's spermatophore.

== Habitat ==
Arion distinctus occurs in a variety of moist habitats, including gardens, waste ground and woodland, but may be absent in harsh upland habitats. In Switzerland it occurs up to 2000 m. It is typically found amongst ground litter or sheltering under wood, stones and soil clods. Studies in agriculture and horticulture have often not distinguished A. distinctus and A. hortensis, but both species are considered to be economically significant pests.

== Distribution ==
This species is believed native to Western, Northern and Central Europe, but has spread eastwards, particularly in synanthropic habitats. The Andorran occurrences are the only confirmed records from the Iberian Peninsula.

- Andorra
- Austria
- Belgium
- Bulgaria
- Croatia
- Czech Republic
- Denmark
- Faroe Islands
- Finland
- France
- Germany
- Great Britain
- Hungary
- Iceland
- Ireland
- Italy (north only)
- Latvia
- Lithuania
- The Netherlands
- Norway (up to 69.6°N)
- Poland
- Russia (Moscow)
- Serbia
- Slovakia
- Slovenia
- Sweden (below 61° N)
- Switzerland
- Ukraine

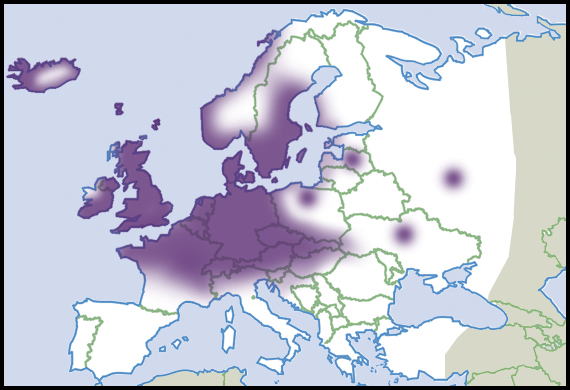
The approximate distribution in Europe

Arion distinctus has also been introduced beyond Europe. The following include only records in which A. distinctus has explicitly been distinguished from A. hortensis.

- Azores
- Madeira
- South Africa (probable identification)
- Canada (British Columbia, Ontario, Nova Scotia)
- USA (California, Pennsylvania, Hawaiʻi)
- Taiwan
- New Zealand

== Life cycle and reproduction ==
Unfortunately with most relevant studies it is unclear to what extent the authors were dealing with populations of the sibling species A. hortensis or with mixed populations. However, a more recent study of a pure A. distinctus population in southern England reports results comparable with most others (but not with Hunter 1968, so that study might have concerned A. hortensis). The majority of individuals matured in early winter and adults persisted until summer. Eggs laid at the beginning of this period produced animals of adult size already by the start of summer, but these disappeared underground over summer and did not mature reproductively until the end of the year. This is an annual life cycle. The development of slugs hatching from eggs laid later in spring appeared to be delayed by the dry summer conditions, generating a bimodal size distribution in autumn, and these slugs only matured in spring, with possibly some delaying further. Hence, most studies have reported a full range of sizes of this species throughout the year, although reproducing adults are largely absent over summer and autumn. Arion distinctus matures several weeks or more later than the sibling species A. hortensis. In captivity eggs took about 27 days to hatch at 12–15 °C.

Genetic evidence implies that A. distinctus is at least predominantly an outbreeder. In captivity it only produced offspring when it had had the company of a conspecific. The two oviduct morphs of A. distinctus mate with each other freely, even though only the tripartite form is able to evert its oviduct over the back of the partner. Coitus lasts 20–30 min, considerably shorter than in A. hortensis. Arion distinctus has been observed mating with A. hortensis in the wild, but no hybrids have been observed.
