= Arion transsylvanus =

Conservation status
- Least Concern (IUCN 3.1)

Scientific classification
- Kingdom: Animalia
- Phylum: Mollusca
- Class: Gastropoda
- Order: Stylommatophora
- Family: Arionidae
- Genus: Arion
- Species: A. transsylvanus

Binomial name
- Arion transsylvanus Simroth, 1885

Synonyms
- Arion (Mesarion) transsylvanus Simroth, 1885 alternative representation; Arion subfuscus var. transsylvanus Simroth, 1885 superseded rank

Species of terrestrial slug

Arion transsylvanus is a species of terrestrial slug in the family Arionidae, the roundback slugs.

It is a member of the Arion subfuscus species complex and known mostly from Transylvania in Romania, where it appears to be the only species of this complex.

== Description and identification ==
Adult A. transsylvanus are 40–70 mm long. Like other members of the genus Arion, they have a rounded end to the tail and the pneumostome is in the front half of the mantle. The colour varies even within a population from bright orange to dark brown. Lateral bands are often present but may be faint or absent. The mucus can be orange or colourless. A useful internal character is that the gonad sits above the digestive gland rather than buried mostly within it like the darker gonad of A. fuscus. Distinguishing A. transsylvanus from both A. fuscus and A. subfuscus is that openings of the epiphallus, bursa duct, and oviduct into the genital atrium lie all along a line.

== Discovery ==
The German slug expert Heinrich Simroth described Arion subfuscus transsylvanus in 1885 as a "variety" (equivalent nowadays to a subspecies) of Arion subfuscus from Transylvania (now part of Romania); he considered it distinct in its external colouration. In 2010, Jordaens et al. reexamined slugs from numerous sites in this region. On the grounds of distinctive allozymes, mitochondrial DNA sequences (16S barcodes) and genital anatomy, these authors considered the Transylvanian population different enough from other populations of Arion subfuscus and Arion fuscus to justify its elevation to a new species. It is appropriate to use Simroth's subspecies name because Jordaens et al. found no other members of this species complex in this region, and thus Simroth's description must have been of this species. It is immaterial that the colouration characters that Simroth used to distinguish his subspecies turn out not to be consistent or diagnostic. Further evidence comes from a specimen from Transylvania in the Senckenberg Natural History Collections Dresden, which it is believed Simroth donated to the Zoological Institute Leipzig, and which proved to have a similar mitochondrial DNA sequence as other Transylvanian slugs examined by Jordaens et al.

== Distribution ==
The species occurs across the Transylvanian part of Romania. It has also been found at one site in eastern Poland and one site in Hungary; unlike in Romania, at these sites it co-occurred with its relative Arion fuscus. The Hungarian occurrence might be native since it was in forest habitat and the locality is a western continuation of the Carpathian Mountains where the species occurs in Romania. A survey in Ukraine did not find A. transsylvanus.

== Habitat ==
Members of the Arion subfuscus species complex have been recorded at up to 2500 m in Romania; it is presumed that they are A. transsylvanus since no other species of the complex has been found in Romania. The species occurs in natural woodland habitats, but also in more synanthropic ones like roadsides.
