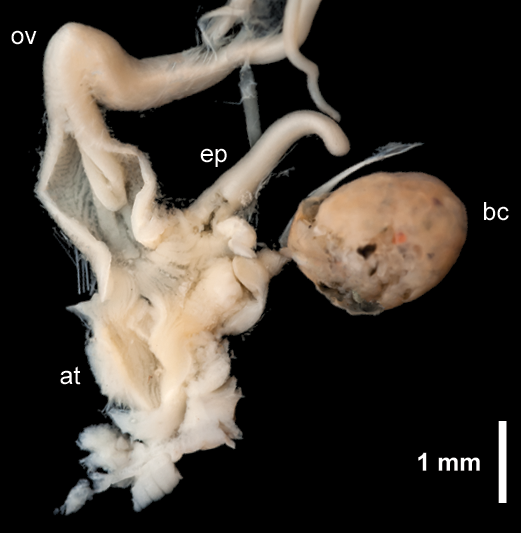
- Reproductive system of Arion occultus

Conservation status
- Data Deficient (IUCN 3.1)

Scientific classification
- Kingdom: Animalia
- Phylum: Mollusca
- Class: Gastropoda
- Order: Stylommatophora
- Family: Arionidae
- Genus: Arion
- Species: A. occultus

Binomial name
- Arion occultus Anderson, 2004
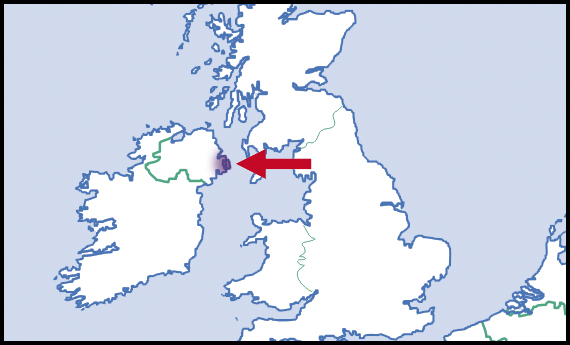

Synonyms
- Arion (Kobeltia) occultus R. Anderson, 2004 alternative representation

= Arion occultus =

Species of gastropod

Arion occultus is a species of small air-breathing land slug, a terrestrial pulmonate gastropod mollusk in the family Arionidae, the roundback slugs.

== Distribution ==
This species occurs in:

- Ireland; appears to be introduced in Ireland, but its country of origin is not known.

== Description ==
This recently recognized species is part of the "Arion hortensis group" of species. It somewhat resembles Arion distinctus in general appearance, and also resembles Arion alpinus, but the internal anatomy of the reproductive system is different.
