= Ariunculus isselii =

Scientific classification
- Kingdom: Animalia
- Phylum: Mollusca
- Class: Gastropoda
- Order: Stylommatophora
- Family: Arionidae
- Genus: Ariunculus
- Species: A. isselii

Binomial name
- Ariunculus isselii Lessona & Pollonera, 1882

Species of gastropod

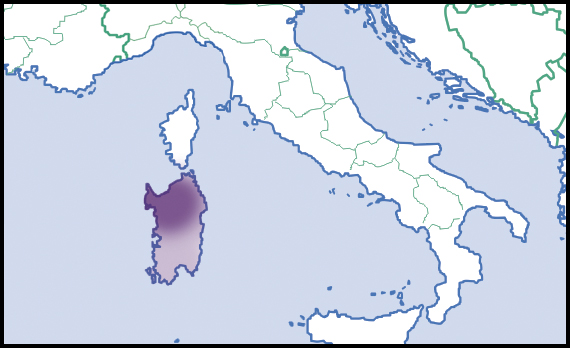
Native range of the species

Ariunculus isselii is a species of terrestrial slug belonging to the family Arionidae. Previously it has been placed in the genus Arion or in its own genus Ichnusarion; the latter is more often treated as a subgenus.

The species is restricted to the island of Sardinia, but widespread there, from sea level to at least 1400 m. Its length crawling can approach 10 cm. Superficially it looks like other large slugs in the related genus Arion, with the pneumostome in the front part of the mantle; its coloration is olive-grey with bright yellow pigment granules superimposed. Unlike species in the arionid genera Arion and Geomalacus, it does not use a spermatophore in its mating, which usually involves 12 hours of courtship. The species can also self-fertilise.
