= Arion hispanicus =

Conservation status
- Data Deficient (IUCN 3.1)

Scientific classification
- Kingdom: Animalia
- Phylum: Mollusca
- Class: Gastropoda
- Order: Stylommatophora
- Family: Arionidae
- Genus: Arion
- Species: A. hispanicus

Binomial name
- Arion hispanicus Simroth, 1886
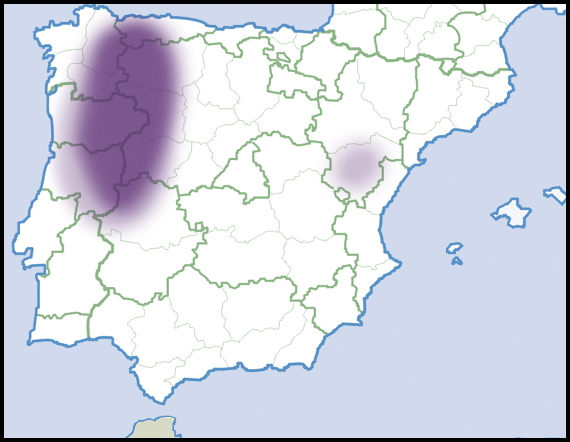

Synonyms
- Arion (Mesarion) hispanicus Simroth, 1886 alternative representation

Species of gastropod

Arion hispanicus, is a large terrestrial gastropod mollusk in the family Arionidae, the round back slugs.

This species is poorly known.

== Distribution ==
This species occurs in Portugal and western Spain.
