= Arion urbiae =

Conservation status
- Least Concern (IUCN 3.1)

Scientific classification
- Kingdom: Animalia
- Phylum: Mollusca
- Class: Gastropoda
- Order: Stylommatophora
- Family: Arionidae
- Genus: Arion
- Species: A. urbiae

Binomial name
- Arion urbiae de Winter, 1986
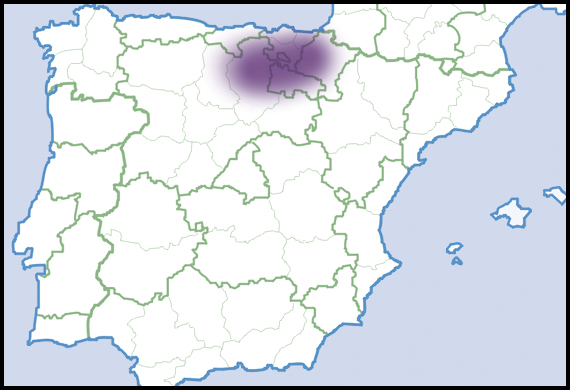

Synonyms
- Arion (Mesarion) urbiae de Winter, 1986 alternative representation; Arion anguloi Martín & B. Gómez, 1988 (a suggested synonym)

Species of gastropod

Arion urbiae, is a large terrestrial gastropod mollusk in the family Arionidae, the round back slugs.

== Description ==
(Original description by de Winter) This is a medium-sized Arion species, typically ranging from greyish to blackish, reaching up to 65 mm when a living animal is fully extended. Its anterior genitalia are similar to Arion subfuscus (Draparnaud, 1805), but are distinctively marked by a wider bursal duct and usually dark pigment on the epiphallus and oviduct. The free oviduct contains two longitudinal folds.

The spermoviduct is more or less greyish. The spermatophore has a spirally arranged, serrated longitudinal ridge and a long filiform tail. In Arion urbiae up to three spermatophores were encountered in the bursa of a single individual, a feature so far unknown in arionids.

Most individuals have a dark grey to near-black dorsum and mantle, fading to greyish near the foot-fringe. A significant number of specimens also display two dirty-white bands along the dorsum and mantle. Along the mantle edge there are about 17 tubercles between the median line of the body and the genital orifice. The sole is yellowish-white in living animals, and the mucus is colourless or very pale yellowish. A cross section through the skin shows that the dark pigment is concentrated in a central layer, surrounded by a paler inner and outer layer Uniquely among arionids, up to three spermatophores have been observed in the bursa of a single individual of this species. In preservation (ethanol), the colour often shifts to brownish.

== Distribution ==
This species occurs in northwestern Spain.
