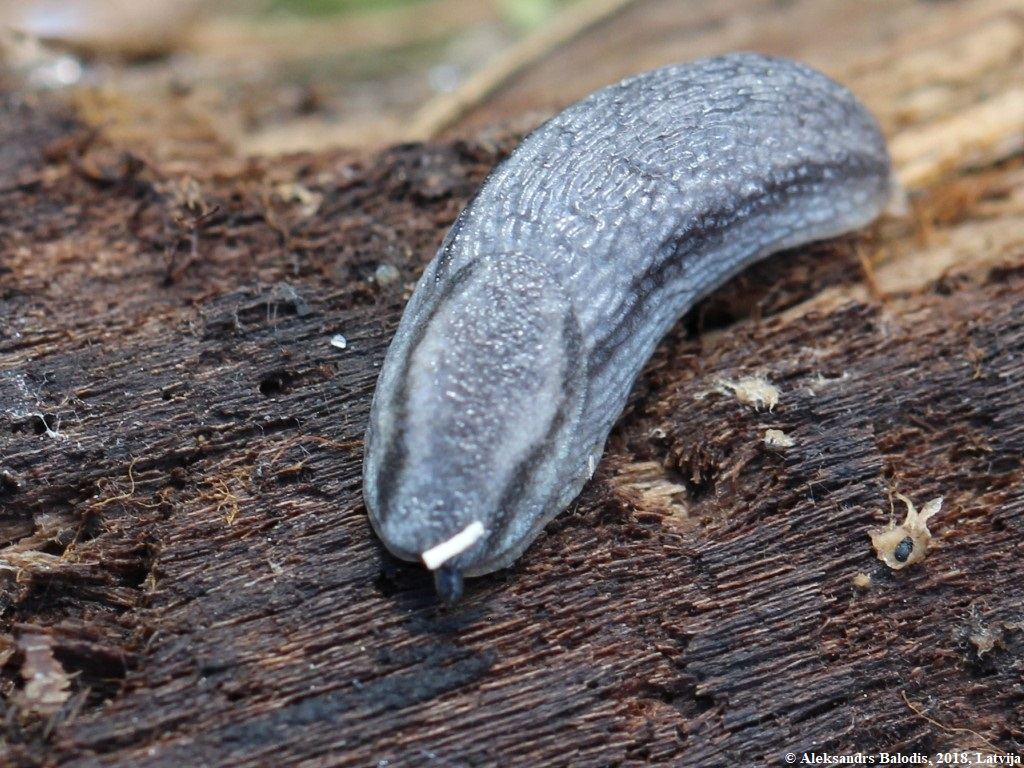

Conservation status
- Least Concern (IUCN 3.1)

- Secure (NatureServe)

Scientific classification
- Kingdom: Animalia
- Phylum: Mollusca
- Class: Gastropoda
- Order: Stylommatophora
- Family: Arionidae
- Genus: Arion
- Species: A. circumscriptus
- Subspecies: A. c. silvaticus

Trinomial name
- Arion circumscriptus silvaticus Lohmander, 1937

Synonyms
- Arion (Carinarion) circumscriptus silvaticus Lohmander, 1937 alternative representation; Arion (Carinarion) silvaticus Lohmander, 1937 superseded rank; Arion circumscriptus var. silvaticus Lohmander, 1937 superseded rank; Arion silvaticus Lohmander, 1937 superseded rank

= Arion circumscriptus silvaticus =

Species of gastropod

Arion circumscriptus silvaticus is a subspecies of air-breathing land slug, a terrestrial pulmonate gastropod mollusk in the family Arionidae.

== Description ==
Note. In slugs it is often difficult to establish good criteria for identifying species using external features or internal features, as colouration can be quite variable, and the rather plastic anatomy makes diagnostic anatomical features difficult to establish.

Up to 40 millimetres (1.6 in) long. A roundback slug but with a keel consisting of pale, raised tubercles along the back. In colour the slug is grey to greyish brown becoming whitish down to the sides. There are broad and well marked dark lateral colour bands (white sides below the bands). The sole is whitish or cream. The mucus is transparent or slightly yellowish. Genitalia: atrium large, broad and flattened, epiphallus wider than vas deferens, oviduct wide, half diameter as atrium, spermatheca elongate and somewhat arrow-shaped.

== Distribution ==
This species occurs in countries and islands including:

- Czech Republic
- Ukraine
- Great Britain
- Ireland

== Taxonomy ==
The original description of the three slugs in the subgenus Carinarion, Arion (Carinarion) fasciatus, Arion (Carinarion) silvaticus and Arion (Carinarion) circumscriptus was based on small differences in body pigmentation and details of the genital anatomy. A recent study of these morphospecies (typological species) claims that previous studies had shown that body colour in these slugs may be influenced by their diet, and the genital differences were not confirmed by subsequent multivariate morphometric analyses. Analysis of alloenzyme and albumen gland proteins had given conflicting results. Also that evidence of interspecific hybridization in places where these predominantly self-fertilizing slugs apparently outcross contradicted their status as biological species. Molecular studies led to the conclusion that the three members of Carinarion are a single species-level taxon. The name Arion fasciatus has priority.
