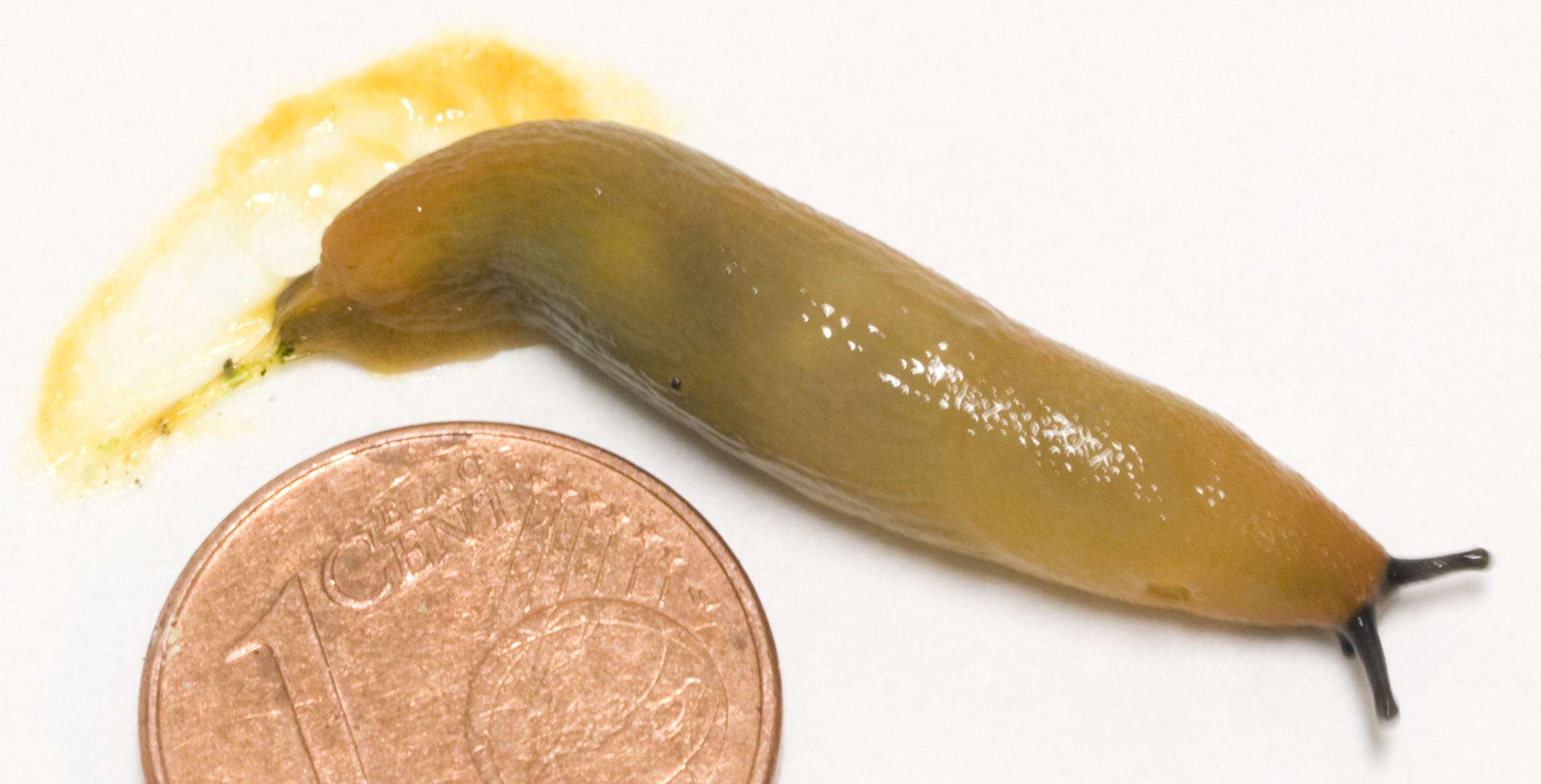
- A live individual of Ariunculus speziae, coin diameter is 16.25 mm

Scientific classification
- Kingdom: Animalia
- Phylum: Mollusca
- Class: Gastropoda
- Order: Stylommatophora
- Family: Arionidae
- Genus: Ariunculus; Lessona, 1881

Type species
- Ariunculus speziae Lessona, 1881

Diversity
- 2 species, each in its own subgenus

= Ariunculus =

Genus of gastropods

Ariunculus is a genus of air-breathing land slugs in the family Arionidae, the roundback slugs. Sometimes it has been considered as a subgenus of Arion, and sometimes the subgenus Ichnusarion has been raised to generic rank.

== Etymology ==
The stem of Arion plus the suffix -unculus, which is a diminutive in Latin. Hence "little Arion". Pollonera justifies why "Ariunculus" is appropriate rather than "Arionculus" (cf. "homo" and "homunculus").

The subgenus name Ichnusarion is also based on "Arion", to which has been added "Ichnusa", a Latin name of Sardinia, where the single species of this subgenus is endemic.

== Species ==
Only two species are currently recognised:

subgenus Ariuncululus

- Ariunculus speziae Lessona, 1881 – type species of the genus; Italian Alps with one record in Switzerland

subgenus Ichnusarion Pollonera, 1890

- Ariunculus isselii Lessona & Pollonera, 1882 – Sardinia

Other species have been discounted as distinct members of the genus:

- A. mortilleti and A. camerani are considered synonyms of A. speziae (all three were originally described in the same article, but differ only in size and coloration, not genitalia);
- A. moreleti is considered a species of Letourneuxia, by some a synonym of Letourneuxia nyctelia;
- A. pallaryi has been synonymised with Letourneuxia nyctelia;
- A. austriacus has been synonymised with Arion subfuscus;
- A. tricolor and A. nigratus are thought to have been misidentified juveniles of a large Arion;
- A. ischii was apparently a misprint for A. isselii.

== Diagnostic characters ==
Genital characters that have been proposed as diagnostic of the genus are:

- the genital pore is very anterior, anterior to the pneumostome;
- the atrium is large;
- the duct of the bursa copulatrix opens near the end of the epiphallus;
- the oviduct is long with two bends;
- the epiphallus blends imperceptibly with the vas deferens;

At least in one species of Ariunculus, this last character reflects that sperm is transferred naked rather than in a spermatophore formed in the epiphallus; this is a fundamental contrast with Arion and Geomalacus.

Ariunculus differs from Geomalacus, and is similar to Arion, in that the caudal gland is prominent and the mantle contains only calcareous granules rather than a shell plate.
