= Arion alpinus =

Arion alpinus may refer to:

- Arion alpinus Pollonera, 1887, a synonym of Arion intermedius Normand, 1852
- Arion alpinus auct. non Pollonera, 1887, a newly reinstated name by Manganelli et al. (2010) is Arion obesoductus Reischütz, 1973
