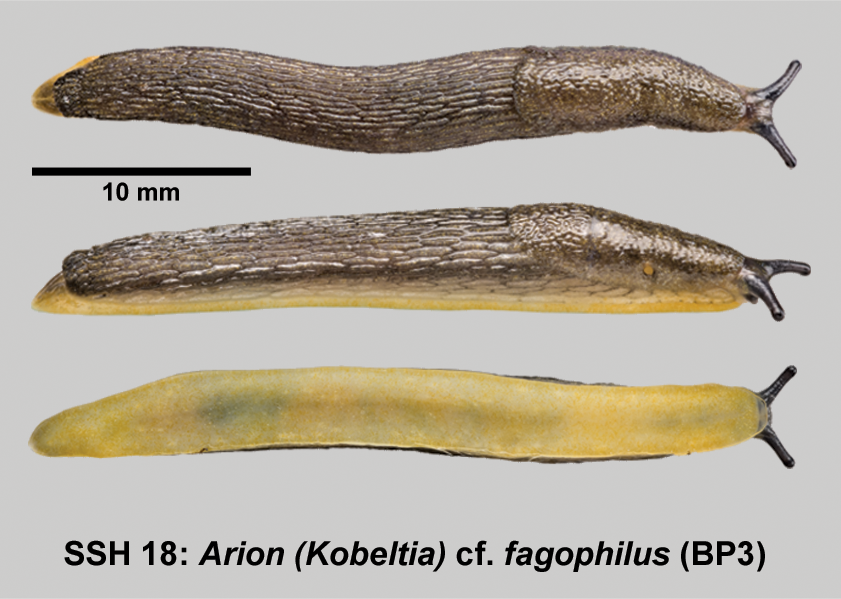

Conservation status
- Least Concern (IUCN 3.1)

Scientific classification
- Kingdom: Animalia
- Phylum: Mollusca
- Class: Gastropoda
- Order: Stylommatophora
- Family: Arionidae
- Genus: Arion
- Species: A. fagophilus

Binomial name
- Arion fagophilus de Winter, 1986
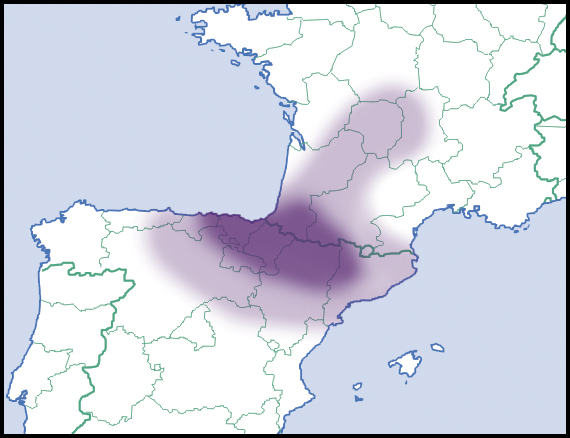

Synonyms
- Arion (Kobeltia) fagophilus de Winter, 1986 alternative representation

= Arion fagophilus =

Species of gastropod

Arion fagophilus, is a large terrestrial gastropod mollusk in the family Arionidae, the round back slugs.

== Description ==
(Original description by de Winter) The measured holotype is 25 mm long and 5.5 mm wide, with a mantle length of 9 mm.

This small to medium-sized Arion slug is immediately recognizable by its striking coloration: a dull grey dorsum and parts of the mantle contrast sharply with white flanks and a bright orange sole and foot-fringe. Internally, the free oviduct consists of two parts: a large, soft section containing a ligula, followed by a muscular, shining section (resembling Arion hortensis Férussac, 1819 ). A thin-walled structure surrounds the epiphallus outlet, which is a key feature, as it differs significantly from the papilla found in other Arion (Kobeltia) species.

This species, with a holotype is visually unique. Unlike other species in the subgenus Kobeltia, the foot-fringe shares the bright yellow-orange colour of the sole. The slug's white flanks are particularly noteworthy: this color is the ground colour itself, not caused by concentrated white pigment granules, as seen in Arion hortensis. While white pigment granules are sparsely scattered across the body, the transition from the grey upper body to the white flanks is often marked by faint, darker lateral bands, which may be barely visible in some specimens. When stretched out against a white surface, the tentacles of living animals show a bright reddish colour. The body is somewhat bell-shaped in cross section, a characteristic shared with Arion (Carinarion) P. Hesse, 1926 species. Most of the pigment forming the right mantle band sits above the respiratory pore.

== Distribution ==
This species occurs in Spain.
