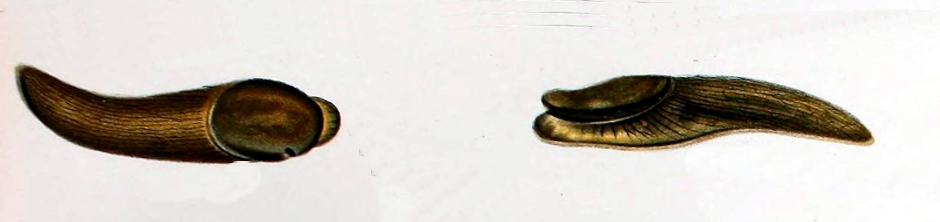
- Arion sibiricus (holotype)

Conservation status
- Data Deficient (IUCN 3.1)

Scientific classification
- Kingdom: Animalia
- Phylum: Mollusca
- Class: Gastropoda
- Order: Stylommatophora
- Family: Arionidae
- Genus: Arion
- Species: A. sibiricus

Binomial name
- Arion sibiricus Simroth, 1902

= Arion sibiricus =

Species of gastropod

Arion sibiricus, is a large terrestrial gastropod mollusk in the family Arionidae, the round back slugs.

== Description ==
(Original description in Latin) The organism has a small stature. Its upper side is obscurely blackish, but its sole is brighter. There is a black stripe or streak on its mantle which fades on the back. Its back is decorated with small, black, longitudinal lines among the wrinkles. The sole is brighter (repeated for emphasis). The young one appears very similar to the brownish young of Arion. Anatomically, while it is similar to the same species in the configuration of the genital ducts, the internal structure of these ducts is quite different from it.

== Distribution ==
This species occurs in Siberia.

== External linbks ==
- iNaturalist: image
