= Arion owenii =

Conservation status
- Least Concern (IUCN 3.1)

- Secure (NatureServe)

Scientific classification
- Kingdom: Animalia
- Phylum: Mollusca
- Class: Gastropoda
- Order: Stylommatophora
- Family: Arionidae
- Genus: Arion
- Species: A. owenii

Binomial name
- Arion owenii S.M. Davies, 1979
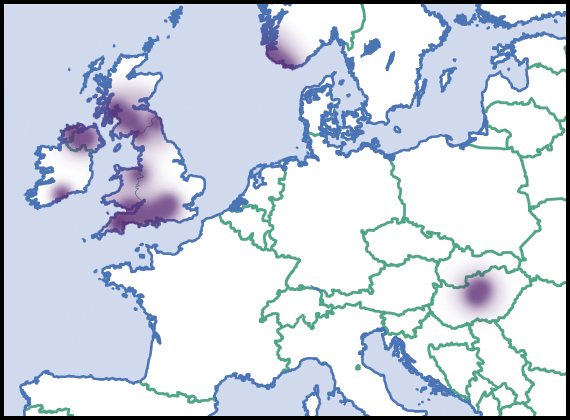

Synonyms
- Arion (Kobeltia) owenii S. M. Davies, 1979 alternative representation

Species of gastropod

Arion owenii is a species of small air-breathing land slug, a terrestrial pulmonate gastropod mollusc in the family Arionidae, the roundback slugs.

== Description ==
Note. In slugs it is often difficult to establish good criteria for identifying species using external features or internal features, as colouration can be quite variable, and the rather plastic anatomy makes diagnostic anatomical features difficult to establish.

An up to 35 mm long roundback slug. The colour is usually brown with dark colour bands, which can be interrupted (dark dots instead of bands), the sides are greyish. The surface with characteristic very regular and rather sharply ridged tubercles. Tentacles are pinkish brown and the sole is usually very pale yellow but sometimes yellow or orange.

== Distribution ==
This species occurs in:

- Great Britain
- Ireland
