= Arion molinae =

Conservation status
- Data Deficient (IUCN 3.1)

Scientific classification
- Kingdom: Animalia
- Phylum: Mollusca
- Class: Gastropoda
- Order: Stylommatophora
- Family: Arionidae
- Genus: Arion
- Species: A. molinae

Binomial name
- Arion molinae Garrido, Castillejo & Iglesias, 1995
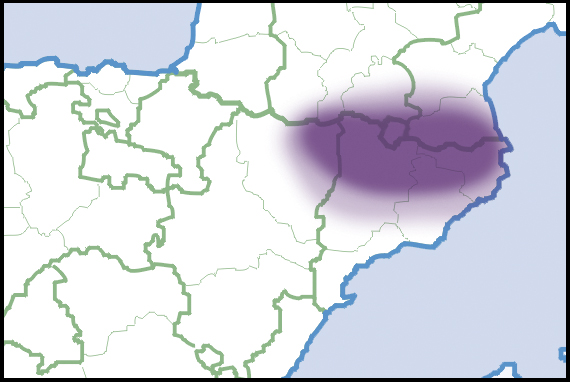

Synonyms
- Arion (Mesarion) molinae Garrido, Castillejo & Iglesias, 1995 alternative representation

Species of gastropod

Arion molinae, is a large terrestrial gastropod mollusk in the family Arionidae, the round back slugs.

== Distribution ==
This species occurs in the Spanish Pyrenees.
