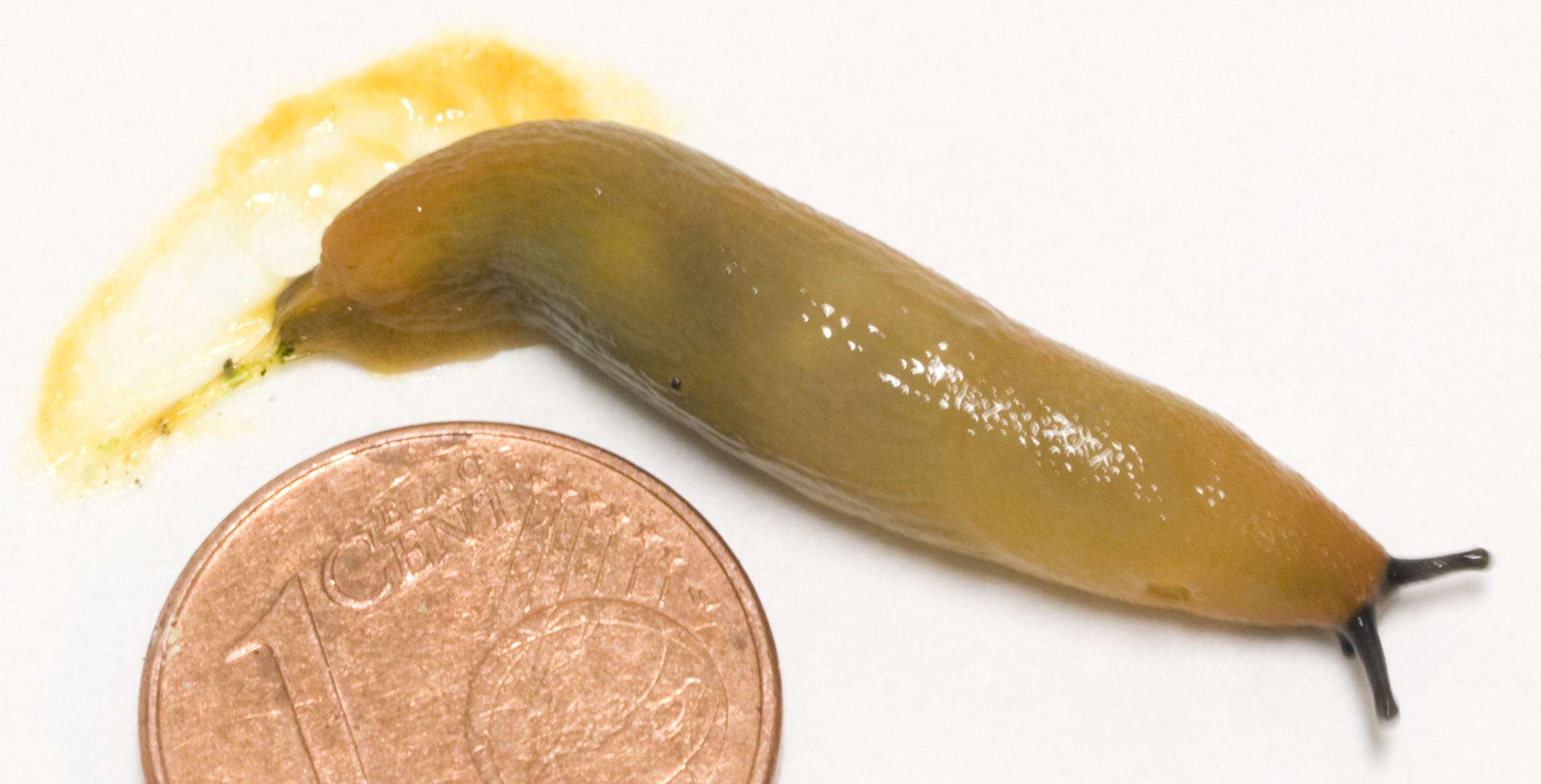

Scientific classification
- Domain: Eukaryota
- Kingdom: Animalia
- Phylum: Mollusca
- Class: Gastropoda
- Order: Stylommatophora
- Family: Arionidae
- Genus: Ariunculus
- Species: A. speziae

Binomial name
- Ariunculus speziae Lessona, 1881

= Ariunculus speziae =

Species of gastropod

Ariunculus speziae is a species of gastropod belonging to the family Arionidae.

The species is found in Italian Alps.
