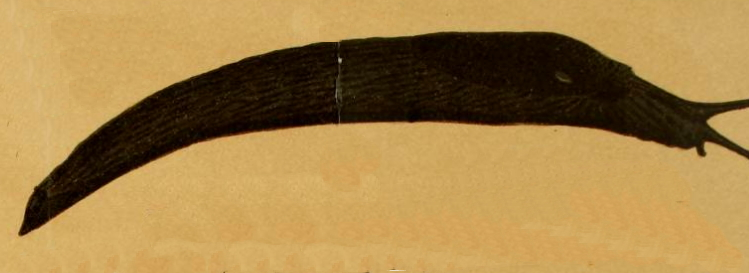
- Arion nobrei (holotype)

Conservation status
- Data Deficient (IUCN 3.1)

Scientific classification
- Kingdom: Animalia
- Phylum: Mollusca
- Class: Gastropoda
- Order: Stylommatophora
- Family: Arionidae
- Genus: Arion
- Species: A. nobrei

Binomial name
- Arion nobrei Pollonera, 1889
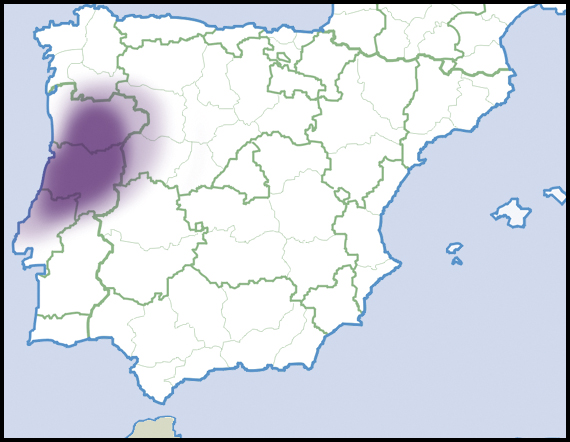

Synonyms
- Arion (Mesarion) nobrei Pollonera, 1889 · alternative representation

= Arion nobrei =

Species of gastropod

Arion nobrei, is a large terrestrial gastropod mollusk in the family Arionidae, the round back slugs.

== Description ==
(Original description in Latin) It is a large, wrinkled animal. The dorsal warts are numerous, keeled, and somewhat wavy, and they are separated by deep and narrow grooves. The mantle is minutely granular, and it is posteriorly rounded to sub-truncated, with the pulmonary aperture being far anterior. The animal is entirely pitch black, although sometimes the margin of the foot is paler and is marked with very black transverse lines. The sole is black and uniform in color, or it has a median zone that is slaty and slightly paler. The mucus is clear (decolorized). The maximum length is 12 centimeters.

== Distribution ==
This species occurs in Portugal.
