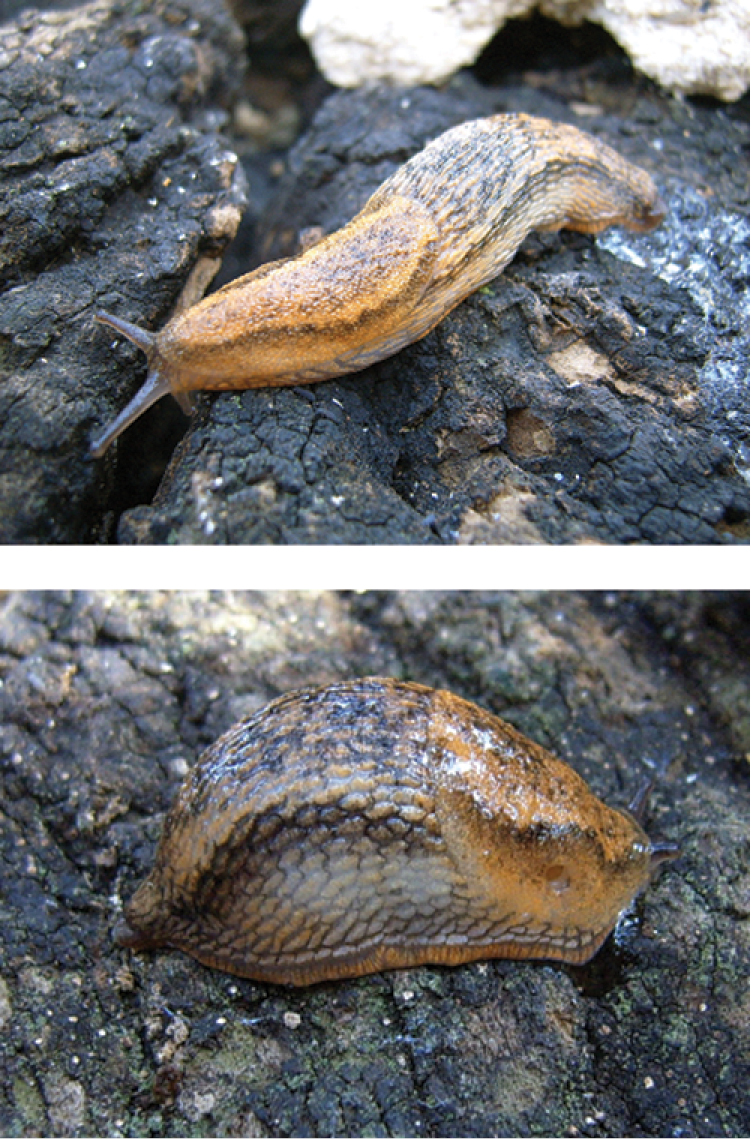
- live specimen Arion ponsi

Conservation status
- Near Threatened (IUCN 3.1)

Scientific classification
- Kingdom: Animalia
- Phylum: Mollusca
- Class: Gastropoda
- Order: Stylommatophora
- Family: Arionidae
- Genus: Arion
- Species: A. ponsi

Binomial name
- Arion ponsi Quintana, 2007
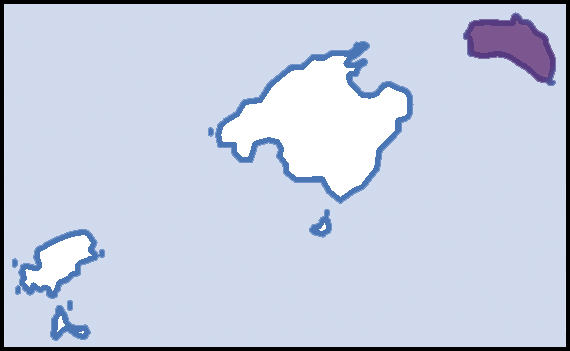

Synonyms
- Arion (Mesarion) ponsi Quintana, 2007 alternative representation

= Arion ponsi =

Species of gastropod

Arion ponsi is a species of small air-breathing land slug, a terrestrial pulmonate gastropod mollusc in the family Arionidae, the roundback slugs.

== Distribution ==
This species occurs on the Balearic Islands, Spain.
