= Arion euthymeanus =

Conservation status
- Data Deficient (IUCN 3.1)

Scientific classification
- Kingdom: Animalia
- Phylum: Mollusca
- Class: Gastropoda
- Order: Stylommatophora
- Family: Arionidae
- Genus: Arion
- Species: A. euthymeanus

Binomial name
- Arion euthymeanus Florence, 1886

Synonyms
- Arion (Mesarion) euthymeanus Florence, 1886 · alternative representation

Species of gastropod

Arion euthymeanus, is a large terrestrial gastropod mollusk in the family Arionidae, the round back slugs.

== Description ==
(Original description in French) The animal is of medium size, elongated, and almost cylindrical in shape. Its back is rounded, becoming thinner and slightly compressed posteriorly. The animal is slow, timid, and somewhat soft. It secretes abundantly a whitish mucus that is slightly shiny and very thick.

The animal is tawny reddish-brown, ornamented with bands and nuanced with darker tones, as follows: a band exists on each side, somewhat broad, black, torn on its edges, and occupying the upper part of the flanks. The flanks are paler and ornamented, especially towards the posterior extremity, with gray, transverse, and broken faint lines. Following this band and delimiting the median space of the back is a zone of the same color as the general background. The middle of the back is obscured by a blackish shade, simulating a large band that starts from the mantle and extends to the mucous pore. This same part is ornamented with very thin, small spots, some of which are oval, and the others are elongated.

The body wrinkles are slightly acute, visible but not very prominent, composed of tubercles that are fused together. These tubercles give the animal, when extended, a most remarkable granular appearance.

The foot is grayish, tinted with bluish posteriorly, and has a well-developed, gray border, which is ornamented with tight black faint lines.

The smantle is oblong, very elongated, rounded anteriorly, and obtuse or rather obscurely truncated posteriorly, barely covering the neck. It is ornamented with fine, slightly ovoid tubercles. These tubercles are tight in the posterior part, while in the anterior part they are spaced, and consequently distant from one another. A narrow, black but not very dark marginal band, clearly interrupted at both extremities, ornaments the sides.

The head and tentacles are reddish-brown and slightly granular. The superior tentacles are short, thin, and well divergent. The inferior tentacles are very little developed, barely equaling a quarter of the length of the former.

== Distribution ==
This species occurs in Southern France.
