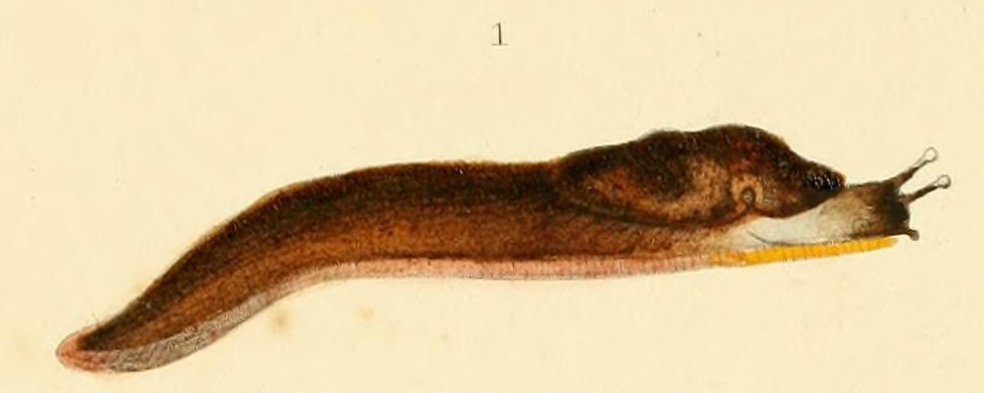
- Arion fuligineus (holotype)

Conservation status
- Least Concern (IUCN 3.1)

Scientific classification
- Kingdom: Animalia
- Phylum: Mollusca
- Class: Gastropoda
- Order: Stylommatophora
- Family: Arionidae
- Genus: Arion
- Species: A. fuligineus

Binomial name
- Arion fuligineus Morelet, 1845
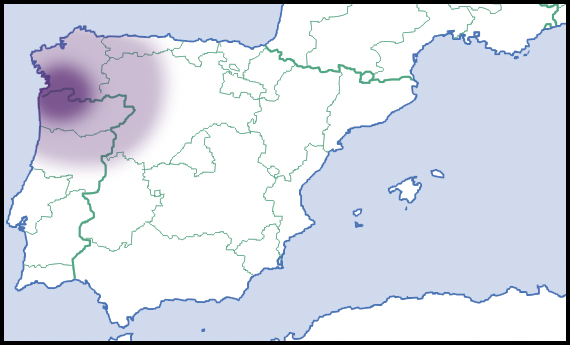

Synonyms
- Arion (Arion) fuligineus Morelet, 1845 · alternative representation; Arion (Arion) lusitanicus Mabille, 1868 · unaccepted > junior subjective synonym; Arion (Mesarion) nobrei Pollonera, 1889 · unaccepted > junior subjective synonym; Arion lusitanicus Mabille, 1868 · unaccepted > junior subjective synonym; Arion nobrei Pollonera, 1889 · unaccepted > junior subjective synonym

= Arion fuligineus =

Species of gastropod

Arion fuligineus, is a large terrestrial gastropod mollusk in the family Arionidae, the round back slugs.

== Description ==
(Original description in French) The body is longitudinally wrinkled (or ridged) and terminates in an obtuse point. The cuirasse (armor/shell-plate) is irregularly bossed and very finely shagreen (textured like rough leather).

The locomotor sole is broad, and its borders are narrow. The tentacles are short.

The branchial cavity is positioned slightly forward. The mantle is a smoky brown color, which is very dark on the head and on the tentacles. The portion of the mantle that usually engages beneath the cuirasse remains colorless, as generally happens in the other species.

The locomotor sole is yellowish, especially anteriorly (at the front). Its margin is finely radiated striped, turning a bright yellow at the base of the neck, and reddish towards the other extremity. A small number of flattened concretions are present in the cuirasse.

== Distribution ==
This species occurs in Portugal and northern Spain.
