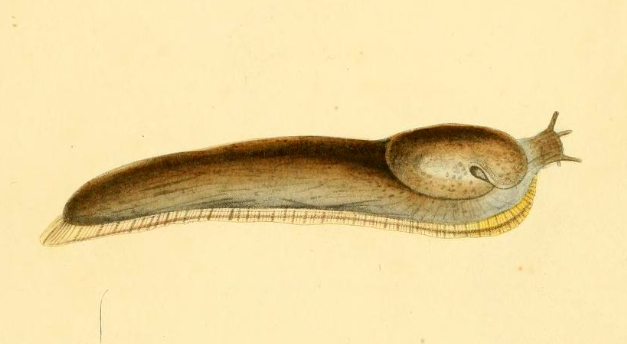
- Arion timidus

Scientific classification
- Kingdom: Animalia
- Phylum: Mollusca
- Class: Gastropoda
- Order: Stylommatophora
- Family: Arionidae
- Genus: Arion
- Species: A. timidus

Binomial name
- Arion timidus Morelet, 1845

= Arion timidus =

Species of gastropod

Arion timidus, is a large terrestrial gastropod mollusk in the family Arionidae, the round back slugs.

== Description ==
(Original description in Latin) The animal is dusky-blackish; the margin is yellowish and radiated (streaked with lines), and it is divided into two parts by a chestnut line.

The mantle (clypeus) is small and worm-like (vermiculate); the body is cylindrical, is obtusely conoidal posteriorly, and is roughly sulcate (grooved).

The head and the tentacles are short and are often semi-retracted; the branchial cavity is anterior.

The [animal] is greenish from dusky, the margin is iron-colored (or steely), and the head and the tentacles are black.

The holotype is characterized by having a very short epiphallus and vas deferens alongside a long and slender bursal duct.

== Distribution ==
This species occurs in central Portugal.
