= Arion iratii =

Conservation status
- Vulnerable (IUCN 3.1)

Scientific classification
- Kingdom: Animalia
- Phylum: Mollusca
- Class: Gastropoda
- Order: Stylommatophora
- Family: Arionidae
- Genus: Arion
- Species: A. iratii

Binomial name
- Arion iratii Garrido, Castillejo & Iglesias, 1995
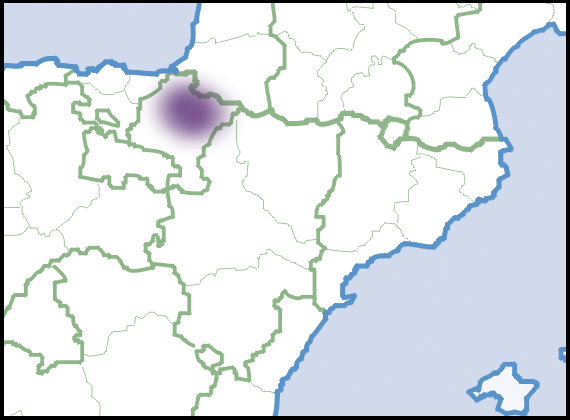

Synonyms
- Arion (Mesarion) iratii Garrido, Castillejo & Iglesias, 1995 alternative representation

Species of gastropod

Arion iratii, is a large terrestrial gastropod mollusk in the family Arionidae, the round back slugs.

== Distribution ==
This species occurs in northern Spain and Wales, Great Britain.
