= Arion atripunctatus =

Conservation status
- Data Deficient (IUCN 3.1)

Scientific classification
- Kingdom: Animalia
- Phylum: Mollusca
- Class: Gastropoda
- Order: Stylommatophora
- Family: Arionidae
- Genus: Arion
- Species: A. atripunctatus

Binomial name
- Arion atripunctatus Dumont & Mortillet, 1853

Synonyms
- Arion (Mesarion) atripunctatus Dumont & Mortillet, 1853 alternative representation

Species of gastropod

Arion atripunctatus, is a large terrestrial gastropod mollusk in the family Arionidae, the round back slugs.

The taxonomic status of Arion atripunctatus is still doubtful. Its anatomy is still unknown.

== Distribution ==
This species occurs in moderate altitudes around 1000 m in the western Alps.
