= Arion wiktori =

Conservation status
- Data Deficient (IUCN 3.1)

Scientific classification
- Kingdom: Animalia
- Phylum: Mollusca
- Class: Gastropoda
- Order: Stylommatophora
- Family: Arionidae
- Genus: Arion
- Species: A. wiktori

Binomial name
- Arion wiktori Parejo & R. Martín, 1990
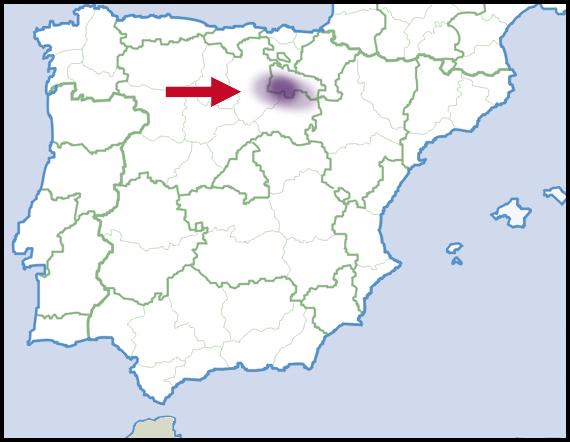

Synonyms
- Arion (Kobeltia) wiktori Parejo & R. Martín, 1990 alternative representation

Species of gastropod

Arion wiktori, is a large terrestrial gastropod mollusk in the family Arionidae, the round back slugs.

== Distribution ==
This species occurs in Spain.
