= Arion magnus =

Conservation status
- Data Deficient (IUCN 3.1)

Scientific classification
- Kingdom: Animalia
- Phylum: Mollusca
- Class: Gastropoda
- Order: Stylommatophora
- Family: Arionidae
- Genus: Arion
- Species: A. magnus

Binomial name
- Arion magnus Torres Mínguez, 1923
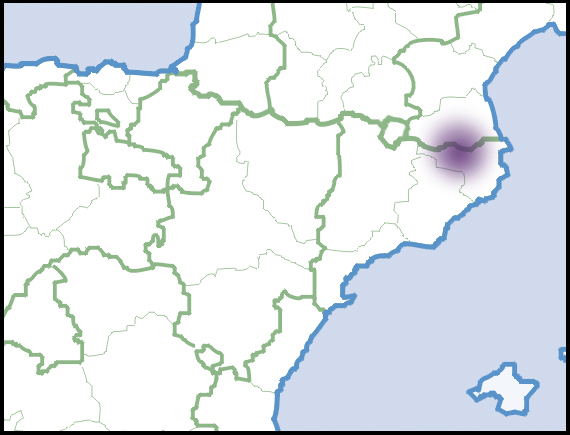

Synonyms
- Arion (Arion) magnus Torres Mínguez, 1923 alternative representation

Species of gastropod

Arion magnus, is a large terrestrial gastropod mollusk in the family Arionidae, the round back slugs.

== Distribution ==
This species occurs in the Spanish Pyrenees.
