= Arion amygdaliformis =

Scientific classification
- Kingdom: Animalia
- Phylum: Mollusca
- Class: Gastropoda
- Order: Stylommatophora
- Family: Arionidae
- Genus: Arion
- Species: A. amygdaliformis

Binomial name
- Arion amygdaliformis Castillejo, Baselga, Lorenzo-Carballa, Iglesias & Gomez-Rodriguez, 2024

Species of gastropod

Arion amygdaliformis, is a large terrestrial gastropod mollusk in the family Arionidae, the round back slugs.

== Distribution ==
This species occurs in Spain.
