= Lessona (surname) =

Lessona is a surname. Notable people with the surname include:

- Alessandro Lessona (1891–1991), Italian politician and academic
- Mario Lessona (1855–1911), Italian zoologist and malacologist
- Michele Lessona (1823–1894), Italian zoologist

== See also ==
- Lessona (disambiguation)
