= Arion baeticus =

Conservation status
- Near Threatened (IUCN 3.1)

Scientific classification
- Kingdom: Animalia
- Phylum: Mollusca
- Class: Gastropoda
- Order: Stylommatophora
- Family: Arionidae
- Genus: Arion
- Species: A. baeticus

Binomial name
- Arion baeticus Garrido, Castillejo & Iglesias, 1994
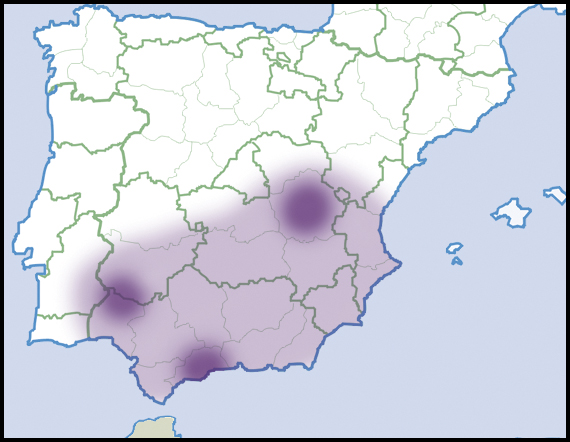

Synonyms
- Arion (Mesarion) baeticus Garrido, Castillejo & Iglesias, 1994 alternative representation

Species of gastropod

Arion baeticus, is a large terrestrial gastropod mollusk in the family Arionidae, the round back slugs.

== Distribution ==
This species occurs in Spain.
