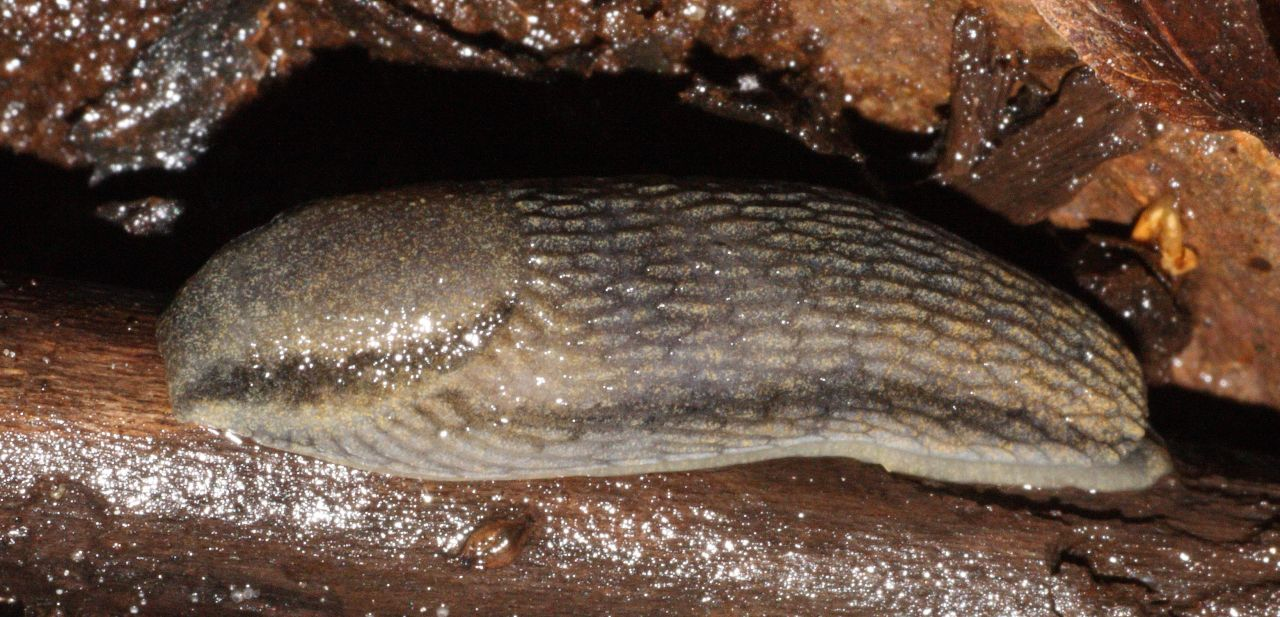

Conservation status
- Least Concern (IUCN 3.1)

- Secure (NatureServe)

Scientific classification
- Kingdom: Animalia
- Phylum: Mollusca
- Class: Gastropoda
- Order: Stylommatophora
- Family: Arionidae
- Genus: Arion
- Species: A. fasciatus

Binomial name
- Arion fasciatus (Nilsson, 1823)

Synonyms
- Arion (Carinarion) fasciatus (Nilsson, 1823) alternative representation; Limax fasciatus Nilsson, 1823 ·

= Arion fasciatus =

Species of gastropod

Arion fasciatus, also known by its common name the Orange-banded Arion, is a species of air-breathing, completely shell-less, land slug, a terrestrial pulmonate gastropod mollusk in the family Arionidae, the round-back slugs.

The species was first described by Sven Nilsson in 1823.

== Distribution ==
Arion fasciatus is originally from Northern Europe, but it has spread to other cool, wet climates, including the British Isles, Canada and the Northern United States. The species was presumably first brought across the Atlantic Ocean during the colonial era. These slugs are generally found in ecotonal habitats.

== Description ==
Arion fasciatus is in many ways similar to most other stylommatophoran slugs. They are hermaphroditic. They have a head, mantle, and foot. There are two sets of retractable tentacles on their heads: the upper pair have light-sensing organs, and the lower two are used to smell. These slugs have a mantle that covers much of the top of the first third of the body, with its pneumostome located on the front right portion of the mantle. On the lower part of the head, the mouth and radula are situated. The orange banded arion has a darkened stripe that extends along the entire body and mantle length on both sides of the body, and is gray, off-white, or tan, with a very light-colored foot.

Arion fasciatus is about six centimeters in length when moving, secreting a clear mucus which is also left behind it and visible as a trail. However, when disturbed, the mucus becomes denser and stickier. A study found that this thicker mucus can prevent predation by Carabid beetles, but that this special mucus becomes exhausted after three minutes of stimulation. It then takes up to a day to get mucus production up to pre-attack levels, leaving the slug susceptible to other predators.

== Feeding habits ==
Although the orange-banded arion will eat fresh vegetable matter, a study on the eating habits of Arion fasciatus found that it does not find fresh leaves as palatable as old dead leaves, likely because these slugs generally feed under the leaf litter layer.

This study also found that the diet of the orange-banded arion is variable throughout the year. For example, there is an increase in animal material eaten during May and June. The hypothesis is that during the colder months, slugs don't move around much under the leaf litter, and take in a lot of leaves where the chlorophyll has already broken down, but during the warmer months, they take advantage of dead earthworms and small arthropods, both of which have high mortality rates.

== Taxonomy ==
The original description of the three slugs in the subgenus Carinarion, Arion (Carinarion) fasciatus, Arion (Carinarion) silvaticus and Arion (Carinarion) circumscriptus was based on small differences in body pigmentation and details of the genital anatomy. A recent study of these morphospecies (typological species) claims that previous studies had shown that body colour in these slugs may be influenced by their diet, and the genital differences were not confirmed by subsequent multivariate morphometric analyses. Analysis of alloenzyme and albumen gland proteins had given conflicting results. Also that evidence of interspecific hybridization in places where these predominantly self-fertilizing slugs apparently outcross contradicted their status as biological species. Molecular studies led to the conclusion that the three members of Carinarion are a single species-level taxon. The name Arion fasciatus has priority.
