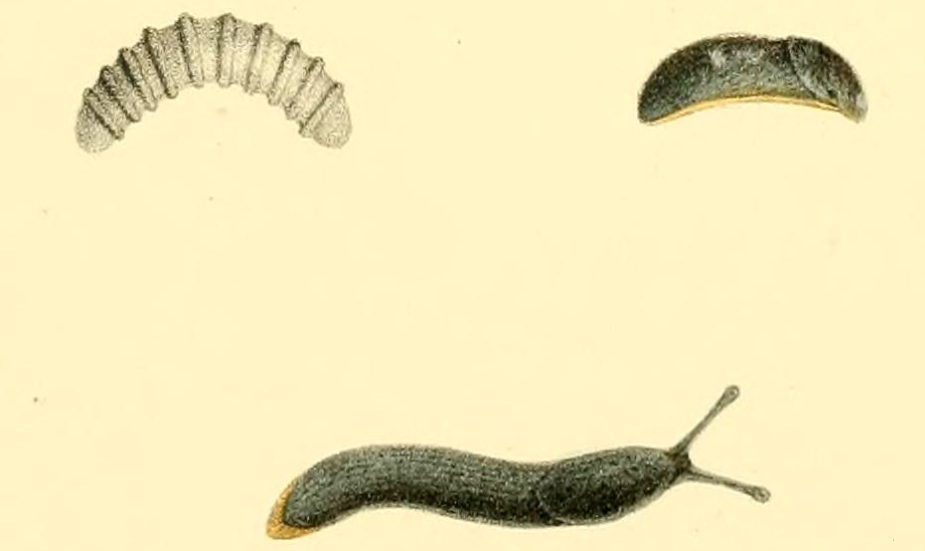
- Arion anthracius (holotype)

Conservation status
- Least Concern (IUCN 3.1)

Scientific classification
- Kingdom: Animalia
- Phylum: Mollusca
- Class: Gastropoda
- Order: Stylommatophora
- Family: Arionidae
- Genus: Arion
- Species: A. anthracius

Binomial name
- Arion anthracius Bourguignat, 1866
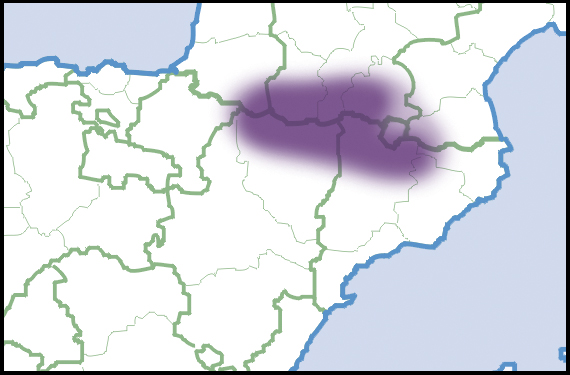

Synonyms
- Arion (Kobeltia) anthracius Bourguignat, 1866 alternative representation

= Arion anthracius =

Species of gastropod

Arion anthracius, is a large terrestrial gastropod mollusk in the family Arionidae, the round back slugs.

== Description ==
(Original description in French) Length of the animal while crawling: 30–32 mm, length of the animal when contracted: 15 mm

The animal is cylindrical and not tapered at its posterior (rear) extremity, but has a somewhat stocky, compact shape and is of moderate size.

The epidermal tissue is of a black so dark that it presents metallic reflections, similar to those seen on the fractures of coal. This color is slightly less intense toward the fringes of the foot. The dorsal wrinkles are small, very delicate, and not very elongated. The locomotory sole (or locomotor plane) is whitish. The back is perfectly convex-rounded.

The mantle is of moderate size, oblong, granular, rounded at the front and back, and covers the neck almost entirely. It is the same shade as the rest of the body. The pulmonary orifice (breathing hole) is anterior (forward) and notches the mantle.

The superior tentacles are elongated, very black, wrinkled (or grooved), and quite globulous at their tips. The inferior tentacles are meager (or small/slender).

The horny jaw is well curved, as wide at its extremities as at its median part, and furrowed by ten salient denticulations (small teeth), the denticles of which slightly exceed the edges.

== Distribution ==
This species occurs in France in the Pyrénées-Atlantiques.
