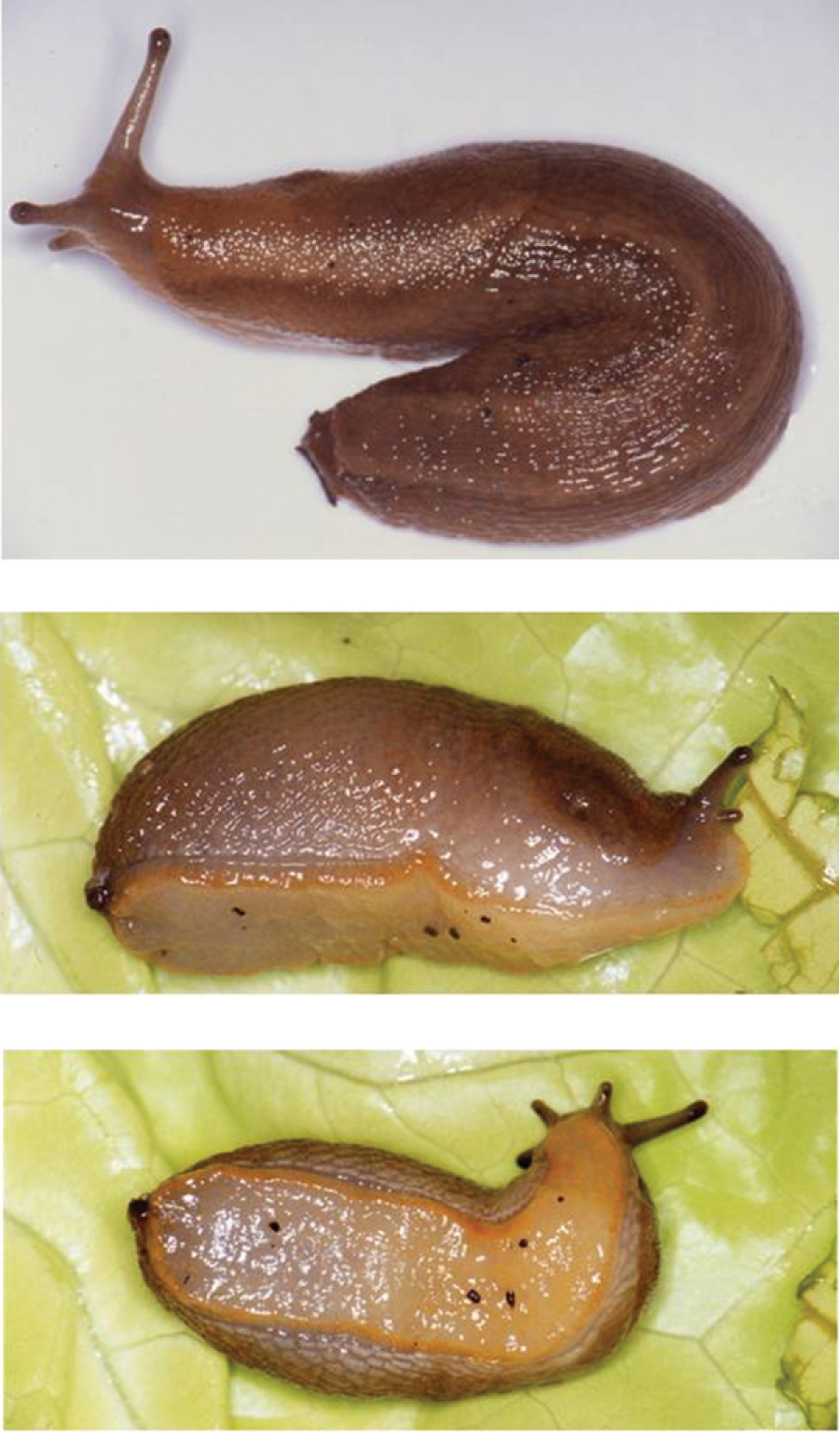

Conservation status
- Least Concern (IUCN 3.1)

Scientific classification
- Kingdom: Animalia
- Phylum: Mollusca
- Class: Gastropoda
- Order: Stylommatophora
- Family: Arionidae
- Genus: Arion
- Species: A. gilvus

Binomial name
- Arion gilvus Torres Mínguez, 1925
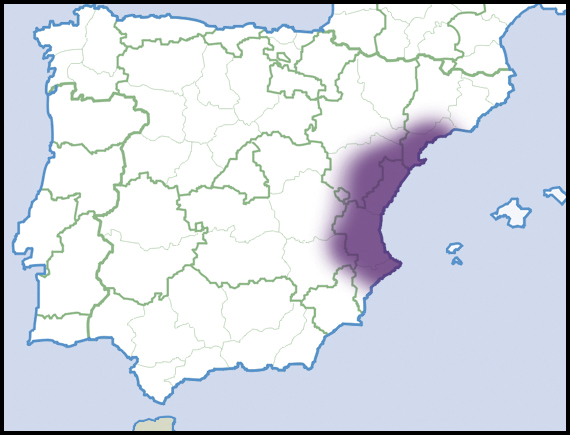

Synonyms
- Arion (Mesarion) gilvus Torres Mínguez, 1925 alternative representation

= Arion gilvus =

Species of gastropod

Arion gilvus is a large terrestrial gastropod mollusk in the family Arionidae, the round back slugs.

== Description ==
Arion gilvus is a medium-sized species, reaching an extended length of up to 65 mm

The back is typically a yellowish to brown color. The body color lightens as it moves downward along the flanks. The flanks are marked by dark lateral bands. A distinctive feature is the presence of a yellowish-grey line running along the upper edge of these dark bands. The foot sole is white or a uniformly yellowish color. The slime secreted by the animal is a pale yellow.

== Distribution ==
This species occurs in the eastern coastal region of Spain.
