= Arion luisae =

Conservation status
- Critically Endangered (IUCN 3.1)

Scientific classification
- Kingdom: Animalia
- Phylum: Mollusca
- Class: Gastropoda
- Order: Stylommatophora
- Family: Arionidae
- Genus: Arion
- Species: A. luisae

Binomial name
- Arion luisae Borrèda & Martínez-Ortí, 2014

Synonyms
- Arion (Kobeltia) luisae Borrèda & Martínez-Ortí, 2014 alternative representation

Species of gastropod

Arion luisae, is a large terrestrial gastropod mollusk in the family Arionidae, the round back slugs.

== Description ==
The length of the species attains 45 mm.

The creature has a brownish-gray color with bands. Its head and tentacles are the same color as the background. It has a grayish border or fringe. The mucus is colorless.

== Distribution ==
This species occurs in the eastern coastal areas of Spain.
