= Arion paularensis =

Conservation status
- Data Deficient (IUCN 3.1)

Scientific classification
- Kingdom: Animalia
- Phylum: Mollusca
- Class: Gastropoda
- Order: Stylommatophora
- Family: Arionidae
- Genus: Arion
- Species: A. paularensis

Binomial name
- Arion paularensis Wiktor & Parejo, 1989
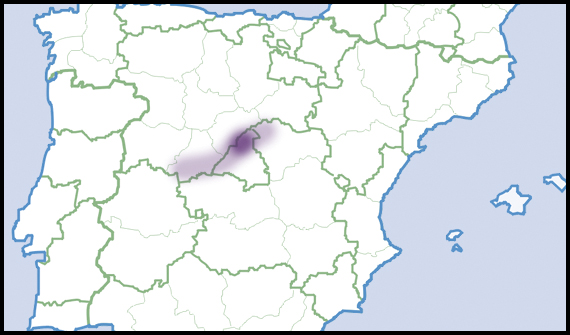

Synonyms
- Arion (Kobeltia) paularensis Wiktor & Parejo, 1989 (incorrect subgeneric placement); Arion (Mesarion) paularensis Wiktor & Parejo, 1989 alternative representation

Species of gastropod

Arion paularensis is a species of small air-breathing land slug, a terrestrial pulmonate gastropod mollusc in the family Arionidae, the roundback slugs.

== Distribution ==
This species occurs in Spain.
