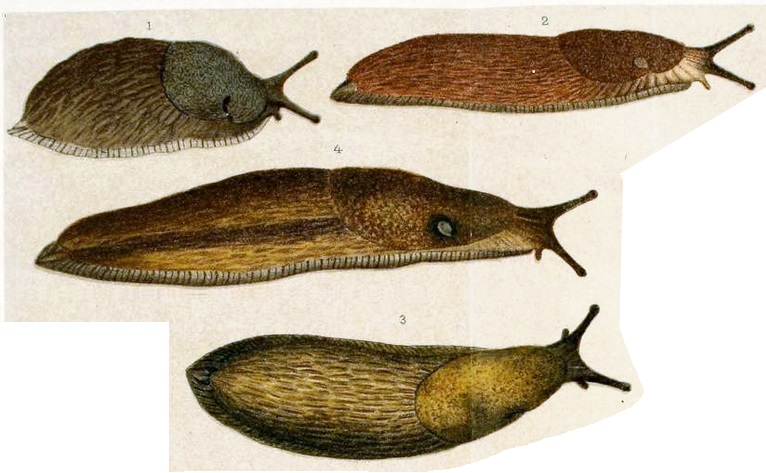
- Arion lusitanicus

Conservation status
- Least Concern (IUCN 3.1)

Scientific classification
- Kingdom: Animalia
- Phylum: Mollusca
- Class: Gastropoda
- Order: Stylommatophora
- Family: Arionidae
- Genus: Arion
- Species: A. lusitanicus

Binomial name
- Arion lusitanicus Mabille, 1868

Synonyms
- Arion (Arion) lusitanicus Mabille, 1868 alternative representation

= Arion lusitanicus =

Species of slug endemic to Portugal

Arion lusitanicus, also known by its common name Portuguese slug, is a species of air-breathing land slug, a terrestrial pulmonate gastropod mollusk in the family Arionidae.

== Distribution ==
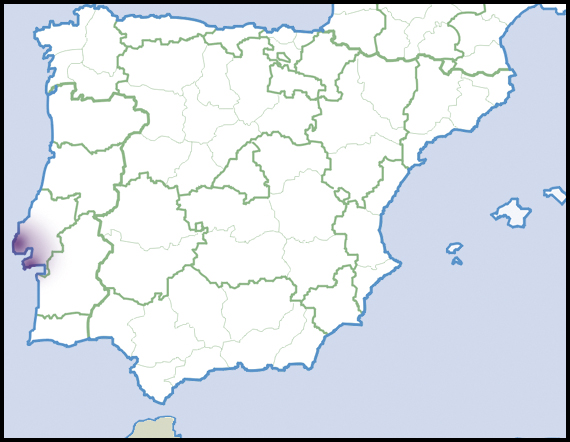
Arion lusitanicus potential distribution.

Arion lusitanicus is endemic to forests of the western Lisbon Region (such as the Sintra-Cascais Natural Park or the Arrábida Natural Park) in Portugal.

== Description ==
In slugs it is often difficult to establish good criteria for identifying species using external features or internal features, as colouration can be quite variable, and the rather plastic anatomy makes diagnostic anatomical features difficult to establish.

It is a rather large (up to 80 mm (3.1 in) long) slug of reddish-brown colour. There are two light brown bands on the dorsum and mantle, the right band passes above the pneumostome. The margin of the foot is reddish or yellowish with dark transverse lines reaching into the lateral parts of the sole. The sole is olive greyish with darker marginal zones. The tentacles are blackish.

Genitalia: Atrium spherical and undivided, spermatheca ovoid, spermatheca duct as long as spermatheca or slightly shorter, getting slightly wider near insertion at atrium, epiphallus longer than vas deferens, vagina longer and wider than spermatheca duct.

== Taxonomy ==
The more well-known Spanish slug (Arion vulgaris Moquin-Tandon, 1855) was for a time misidentified as Arion lusitanicus, but the two slugs are not very closely related, differing in internal anatomy, shape of spermatophore and number of chromosomes.
