= Arion simrothi =

Conservation status
- Data Deficient (IUCN 3.1)

Scientific classification
- Kingdom: Animalia
- Phylum: Mollusca
- Class: Gastropoda
- Order: Stylommatophora
- Family: Arionidae
- Genus: Arion
- Species: A. simrothi

Binomial name
- Arion simrothi Kunkel, 1909

Synonyms
- Arion (Mesarion) simrothi Künkel, 1909

Species of gastropod

Arion simrothi is a species of air-breathing land slug, a terrestrial pulmonate gastropod mollusk in the family Arionidae, the round-back slugs.

This is a taxon inquirendum, subgeneric affiliation unclear.

== Distribution ==
This species is found only in Germany.
