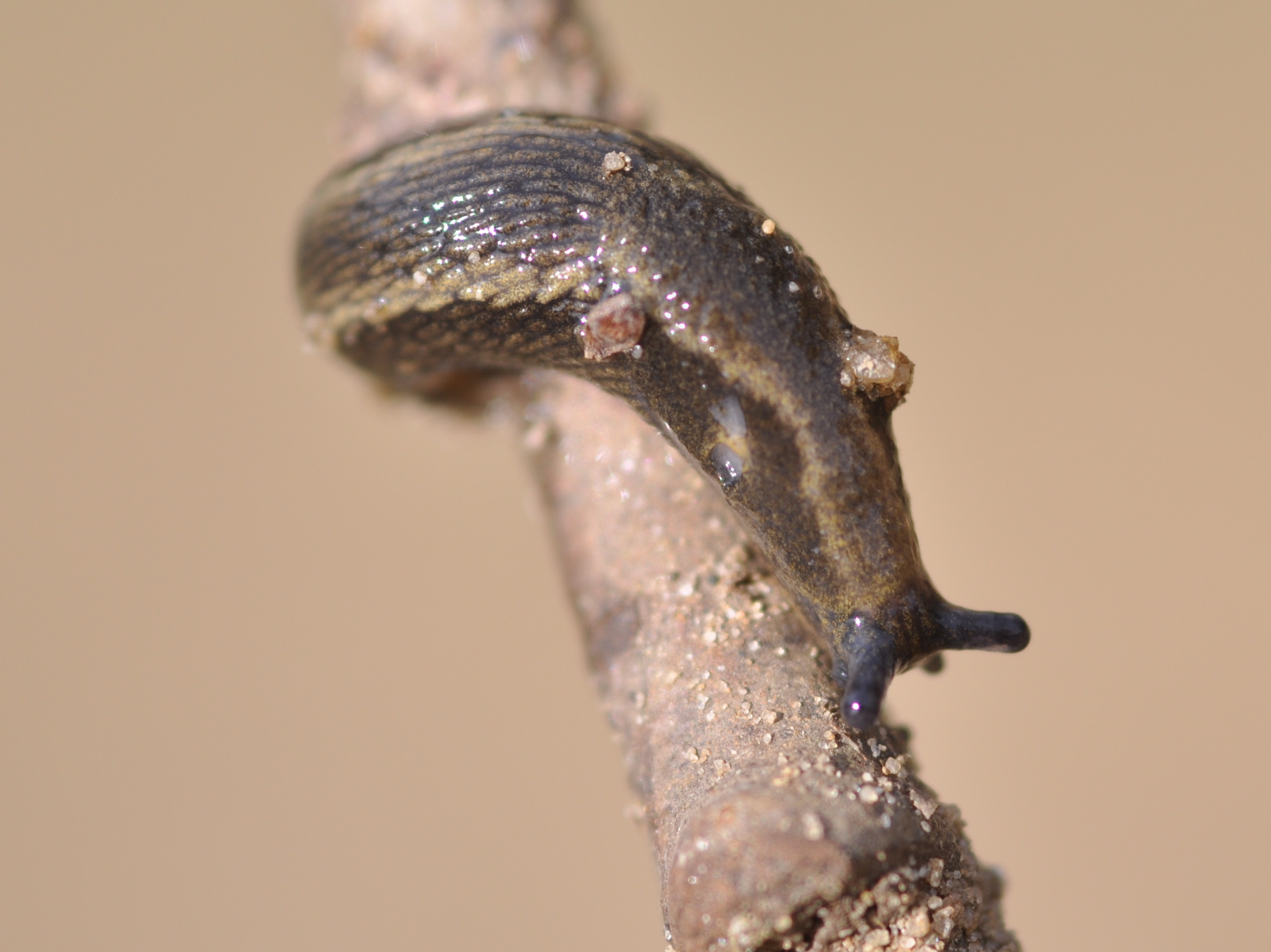
- Arion hortensis

Conservation status
- Least Concern (IUCN 3.1)

- Secure (NatureServe)

Scientific classification
- Kingdom: Animalia
- Phylum: Mollusca
- Class: Gastropoda
- Order: Stylommatophora
- Family: Arionidae
- Genus: Arion
- Species: A. hortensis

Binomial name
- Arion hortensis A. Férussac, 1819

Synonyms
- Arion elongatus Collinge, 1894; Arion fuscus var. pyrenaicus Moquin-Tandon, 1855; Arion pyrenaicus Fagot, 1881; Arion rubellus Sterki, 1911

= Arion hortensis =

Species of gastropod

Arion hortensis, also known by its common name the "garden slug", "small striped slug" or "black field slug" is a species of small air-breathing land slug, a terrestrial pulmonate gastropod mollusk in the family Arionidae, the roundback slugs.

In Britain, the name Arion hortensis was previously applied to a species complex, consisting of this species plus Arion distinctus Mabille, 1868 and Arion owneii Davies, 1979. Here the name is used sensu stricto.

== Description ==
With slugs, it is often difficult to establish good criteria for identifying species using external features or internal features, as colouration can be quite variable, and the rather plastic anatomy makes diagnostic anatomical features difficult to establish. See the article on Arion distinctus for characters distinguishing that from this species. The clearest character is the structure at the entrance to the epiphallus.

A 30–40 mm. long (exceptionally up to 50 mm) roundback slug. In colour it is grey to bluish black, with dark lateral bands (the right band usually running entirely above the pneumostome). The tentacles are bluish or reddish, and the slug bluish or orange tip at the tail. The first row of tubercles above the foot-fringe is white. The contracted body is semicircular (not bell-shaped) in transverse section. The sole is orange or yellow. The body mucus is yellow-orange. Juveniles are bluish grey with a darker dorsum and a yellow sole.

== Distribution ==
This species is native to European countries and islands, including Great Britain, Ireland, and other areas. It has also been introduced to various other countries, including Tasmania.

== Ecology ==
This slug lives in gardens, fields, pastures and similar habitat. This slug serves as an intermediary host for Muellerius capillaris.
