= Lessona (disambiguation) =

Lessona is a comune (municipality) in the Province of Biella in the Italian region Piedmont.

Lessona may also refer to:

- Lessona (wine), an Italian wine
- Lessona (surname)
