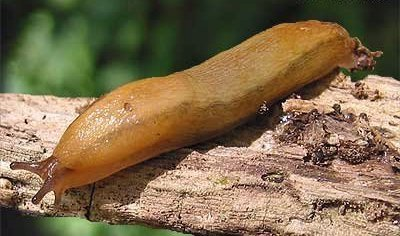
- An active individual from the Netherlands
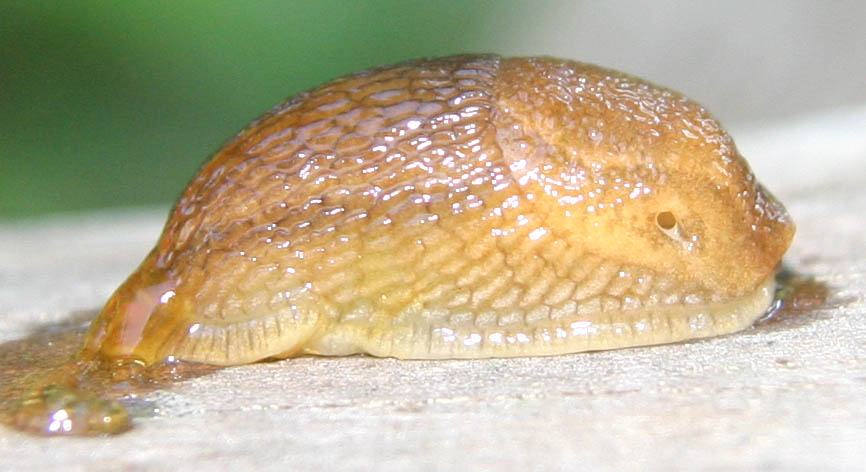
- A contracted individual of Arion fuscus from the Czech Republic

Conservation status
- Least Concern (IUCN 3.1)

Scientific classification
- Kingdom: Animalia
- Phylum: Mollusca
- Class: Gastropoda
- Order: Stylommatophora
- Family: Arionidae
- Genus: Arion
- Species: A. fuscus

Binomial name
- Arion fuscus (O.F. Müller, 1774)

Synonyms
- Arion (Mesarion) fuscus (O. F. Müller, 1774) alternative representation; Limax fuscus O. F. Müller, 1774

= Arion fuscus =

Species of gastropod

Arion fuscus, commonly known as the dusky arion or dusky slug, is a species of air-breathing land slug, a terrestrial pulmonate gastropod mollusk in the family Arionidae, the roundback slugs.

Arion fuscus was formerly included within Arion subfuscus (Draparnaud, 1805). The two species have very similar morphologies and have overlapping distributional ranges in Northwestern Europe. Arion fuscus is widespread throughout Central, Northern and Eastern Europe whereas A. subfuscus is mostly restricted to Western Europe. Colloquially they may be distinguished as "northern" and "western" types, e.g. northern dusky arion or northern dusky slug for A. fuscus but western dusky arion/slug for A. subfuscus sensu stricto. The two taxa together are referred to as the species complex A. subfuscus/fuscus. They are separable only by genetic analysis or by the position and colour of the gonad..

== Description ==
A 50–70 mm roundback slug. It is brown in colour, ranging from black-brown through olive-brown to orange and bright reddish-orange. Darker lateral bands are present. Dark pigment reaches under the pneumostome from back to front. The foot fringe is pale with thin lines. The sole is uniformly pale/translucent.The tentacles are pale or dark. It does not contract into a bell shape when stimulated. The dusky arion differs from other Arion species in its yellow-orange body mucus. Genitalia: Atrium about half diameter of spermatheca, spermatheca spherical, oviduct large and swollen like in Arion lusitanicus.

== Distribution ==
This species occurs in European and Asian countries and islands including:

- Austria
- Bulgaria
- Czech Republic - least concern (LC)
- Germany
- Netherlands
- Poland
- Slovakia
- Great Britain
- Ireland
- China

In eastern North America, it is the most widely introduced non-native slug, with a range from Southern Canada to South Carolina, and west to Wisconsin.

== Ecology ==
This slug is crepuscular and most active at dusk.

=== Habitat ===
This slug lives on the ground, under fallen logs, rocks and under bark in woodland areas, but it can also take advantage of hedges, gardens, pastures, open fields, drier jack pine stands, yards, wetlands, forests and dunes. It is not as arboreal as the larger philomycid slugs. Its habitat varies by season: in fall it forages in moist plant matter, in winter it burrows into the soil, in spring it returns to the surface, and in summer it seeks shelter to avoid desiccation.

=== Diet ===
This slug is omnivorous and detritivorous. It will eat animal excrement, dead insects, fungi, yellowing foliage, dying plants, dead or dying worms, and fruit.

=== Reproduction and life cycle ===
Like most land gastropods, Arion fuscus is hermaphroditic and can both self fertilize and reproduce sexually depending on conditions. They generally live 8-12 months. They normally lay clusters of dozens of eggs at a time. Arion fuscus/subfuscus are semelparous and most adult Arion subfuscus die shortly after reproduction but this can vary based on conditions. Generally eggs hatch sometime between autumn and winter, and adults die in summer.

=== As an invasive species ===
This species is the most widely introduced non-native slug in eastern North America, significantly outnumbering native species. Their flexible habitat requirements allow them to colonize more successfully than other slugs, and they may be able to hatch in autumn and become active in spring before other slugs who hatch in Spring. It may be a threat to the orchid Calypso bulbosa and to other early emerging native plant species in the Great Lakes region of the United States, and is the only slug active when it emerges. Further studies are necessary to confirm details.
