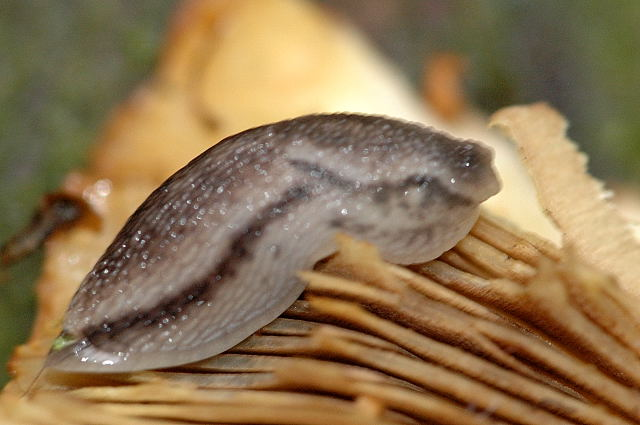
- Arion circumscriptus partially retracted

Conservation status
- Least Concern (IUCN 3.1)

- Secure (NatureServe)

Scientific classification
- Kingdom: Animalia
- Phylum: Mollusca
- Class: Gastropoda
- Order: Stylommatophora
- Family: Arionidae
- Genus: Arion
- Subgenus: Arion (Carinarion)
- Species: A. circumscriptus

Binomial name
- Arion circumscriptus Johnston, 1828

= Arion circumscriptus =

Species of gastropod

Arion circumscriptus, common name brown-banded arion, is a species of air-breathing land slug, a terrestrial pulmonate gastropod mollusk in the family Arionidae.

It is commonest in woodland, occurring across most of Europe, except for more southern regions, and is also widespread in North America. It has been argued that A. circumscriptus is best considered a colour morph of Arion fasciatus.

Subspecies

- Arion circumscriptus circumscriptus G. Johnston, 1828
- Arion circumscriptus silvaticus Lohmander, 1937

== Taxonomy ==
The subgenus Carinarion Hesse, 1926 contains three species—Arion fasciatus, Arion silvaticus and Arion circumscriptus—distinguished on the basis of small differences in pigmentation and in proportions of their genital anatomy. Further study of these morphospecies (typological species) revealed that their body colour may be influenced by diet, and that the putative genital differences do not consistently agree with identifications based on pigmentation and allozymes. In much of their range these slugs predominantly self-fertilise, leading to distinct genetic strains and thus generating associations between coloration and other phenotypic characters. However, in other regions of Europe where these slugs more often outcross there was evidence of hybridization between strains, contradicting their status as biological species. Moreover, sequencing of mitochondrial DNA revealed that the inferred phylogeny did not match an arrangement in which the three morphologically recognised species form distinct clades.

The suggestion from that work was to treat all three Carinarion taxa as a single species, and this has been followed by recent French literature. The name Arion fasciatus then has priority. However, in Britain A. fasciatus s.s. is more distinct than the other two taxa both morphologically and genetically, so that recent British literature considers A. silvaticus as part of A. circumscriptus s.l., but retains A. fasciatus s.s. as distinct even though these taxa may occasionally hybridise. Arion circumscriptus circumscriptus and Arion circumscriptus silvaticus have then been considered as subspecies. Others still consider the situation unresolved and provisionally retain the original three species.

Before the taxonomic work of Lohmander in 1937 and Waldén in 1955, and even for some years following, the different species of Carinarion were not distinguished and the name Arion circumscriptus was used to cover all forms.

== Description and identification ==
Like with other Arion species, the pneumostome lies in the anterior half of the mantle, and the back is round in cross-section rather than with a keel. However, the subgenus Carinarion is distinguished by a row of paler tubercles along the midline of the back, giving the impression of a keel; this is less prominent in adults. Another feature of Carinarion is that the cross-section is bell-shaped, with splayed-out rather than inward-curving sides. The overall colour of A. circumscriptus is a monochrome dark grey (sometimes with a tinge of blue or brown), with a darker dorsal band and a darker lateral band along each side, the one on the right running above the pneumostome. The flanks below are paler. The sole is white or pale grey, and the mucus colourless, or sometimes pale yellow. Length reaches 40 mm, or some say up to 50 mm.

Several characters have been proposed to distinguish the species within Carinarion, but note the evidence that they should better all be considered colour morphs of one species (see Taxonomy section). Arion fasciatus is distinguished by reaching a larger size and by the yellow or orange flush below the lateral band (which disappears in alcohol), but the other two Carinarion species may also show faint yellow coloration. Dark flecks on the mantle distinguish A. circumscriptus from A. silvaticus and A. fasciatus, and the flanks of A. silvaticus are brighter but with a slightly broader lateral band. Internally, only A. circumscriptus shows strong pigmentation on the epiphallus. Classical morphological distinctions based on size of the atrium, epiphallus and oviduct have not been supported when quantitative measurements are compared against identifications based on pigmentation and allozymes. Since the species are predominantly self-fertilizing, amongst the genetic strains present in a local area certain characters may be consistently associated with one another, yet in another area, with different genetic strains, the same characters may not agree.

== Life cycle ==
A study in southern England found that adults were present from January to July, with some of these maturing only as late as May; later maturing adults were smaller than those maturing earlier in the year. Few individuals were found above ground over the dry summer months, but otherwise immature animals of a wide range of sizes were present throughout the year. In late summer and autumn many immature animals were already of adult mass. The life cycle was predominantly annual, but some animals may have taken 18 months to mature. The life cycle appears similar in a study in Moscow gardens, although slightly delayed there by the Russian winter. A study in Michigan grassland also found adults most abundant in spring and summer.

Arion circumscriptus reproduces predominantly by self-fertilization, leading to inbred genetic strains, but the presence of rare heterozygotes demonstrates that mating does occasionally result in outcrossing. The incidence of outcrossing is higher in Central Europe than in North-west Europe.

== Habitat and distribution ==
Arion circumscriptus is most typical of broadleaved woods in temperate climates, occurring in the litter layer, under dead wood and under bark; it sometimes also occurs in other habitats of cultivated land, such as roadsides and waste ground. It is only occasional in gardens and not considered a pest. It occurs up to an altitude of 1300 m in Switzerland.

The species is widespread and common across North-West, Central and Eastern Europe, including southern Scandinavia (naturally to 62° in Sweden, further north still in gardens; also in Iceland). To the east it occurs in Ukraine and as far as the Vyatka river basin and north Caucasus in Russia. But it is absent in southern Europe (e.g. in the Iberian Peninsula and Greece; only present in northern part of Italy). In the Czech Republic re-identifications have led to it being considered much less common than once thought. In contrast, there has been a real decline in Austria, where it has been assessed as vulnerable.

As an introduction, A. circumscriptus is widespread in the U.S.A. and Canada on both sides of the continent, spreading from gardens into natural habitats.

== Parasites ==
Parasites of Arion circumscriptus include:

- Parelaphostrongylus tenuis
- Aelurostrongylus abstrusus
