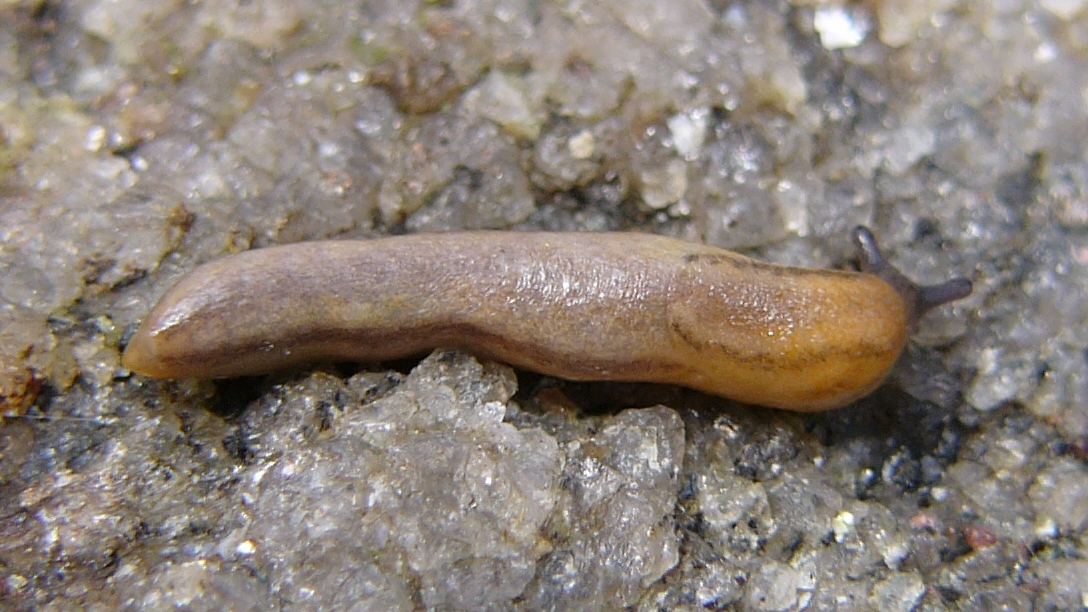
- Arion obesoductus

Conservation status
- Least Concern (IUCN 3.1)

Scientific classification
- Kingdom: Animalia
- Phylum: Mollusca
- Class: Gastropoda
- Order: Stylommatophora
- Family: Arionidae
- Genus: Arion
- Species: A. obesoductus

Binomial name
- Arion obesoductus Reischütz, 1973

Synonyms
- Arion alpinus auctt. non Pollonera, 1887; Arion (Kobeltia) obesoductus P. L. Reischütz, 1973 alternative representation; Arion (Microarion) obesoductus P. L. Reischütz, 1973 (original combination)

= Arion obesoductus =

Species of gastropod

Arion obesoductus is a species of air-breathing land slug, a terrestrial pulmonate gastropod mollusk in the family Arionidae, the round-back slugs.

== Distribution ==
Arion obesoductus has been described from Austria. The distribution of Arion obesoductus also includes:

- southern parts of the Czech Republic
- Germany
