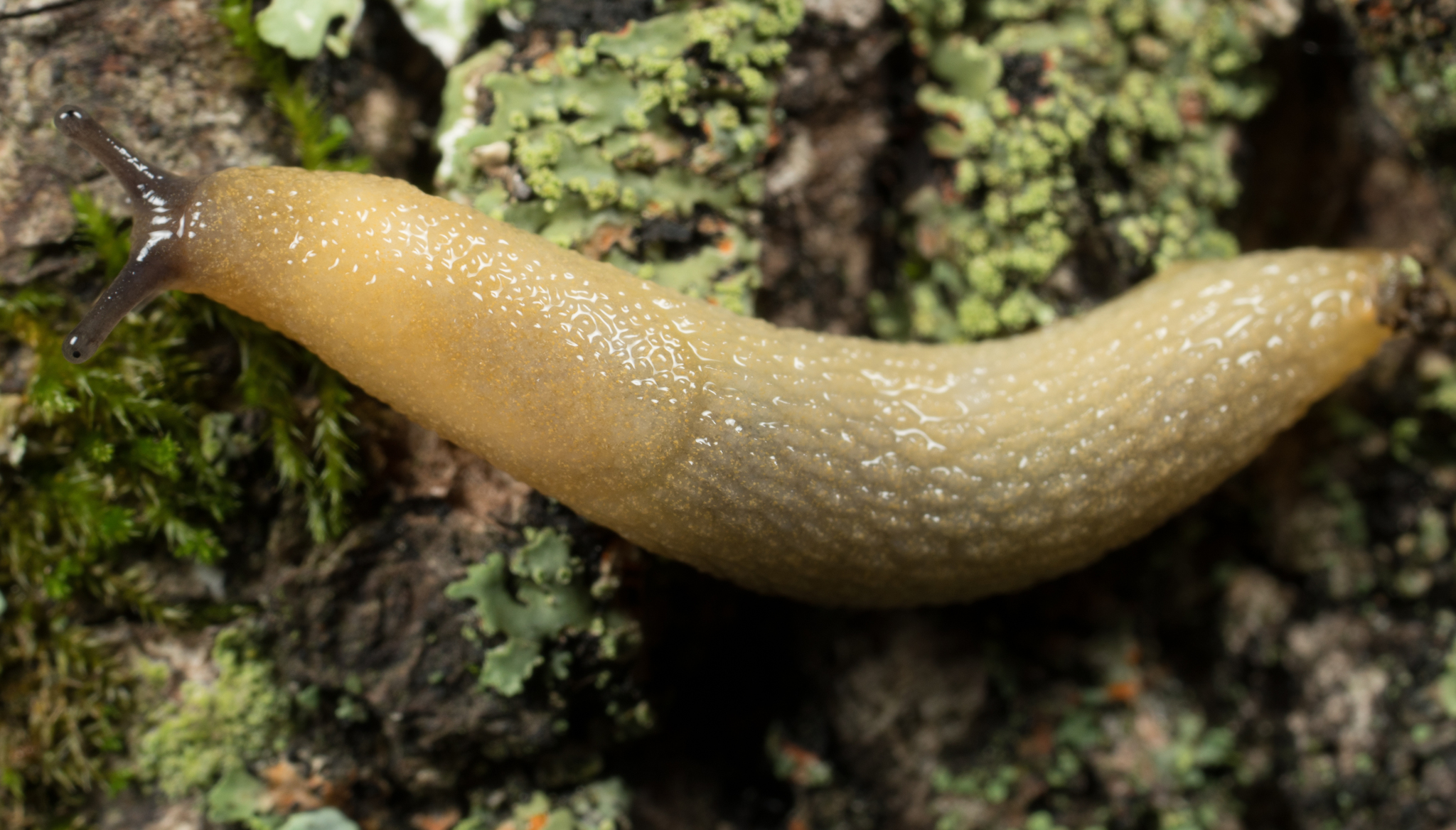
- A. intermedius showing characteristically prickley tubercles

Conservation status
- Least Concern (IUCN 3.1)

- Secure (NatureServe)

Scientific classification
- Kingdom: Animalia
- Phylum: Mollusca
- Class: Gastropoda
- Order: Stylommatophora
- Family: Arionidae
- Genus: Arion
- Species: A. intermedius

Binomial name
- Arion intermedius Normand, 1852

Synonyms
- Arion (Kobeltia) intermedius Normand, 1852 alternative representation; Arion (Microarion) intermedius Normand, 1852; Arion alpinus Pollonera, 1887 junior subjective synonym; Arion verrucosus Brevière, 1881

= Arion intermedius =

Species of gastropod

Arion intermedius is a species of land slug in the family Arionidae, the roundback slugs. It is known commonly as the hedgehog slug, hedgehog arion, and hedgehog arion slug.

== Distribution ==
It is native to Western Europe and a part of Central Europe, from northern Portugal to western Poland, and from southern Scandinavia to northern Italy. It is believed native to Czechia, where the majority of its records come from various types of forests. Records at the edge of its European range more likely to be the result of introductions are from Slovakia, Austria, Hungary, Bulgaria, Finland, Iceland, and southern Italy. It has also been introduced to many regions beyond Europe, including North and South America, Australia, New Zealand, South Africa, and some Pacific islands.

== Description ==
This slug is 1.5 to 2 cm long when adult. It is variable in color and patterning, being white, pale yellowish or gray, with or without lateral bands, and it has darker gray tentacles and a yellow or orange sole. It becomes compact and "nearly bell-shaped" when contracted. The tubercles that texture the dorsal surface of its body taper to sharp, prickle-like points, inspiring the common name hedgehog slug. This appearance of the tubercles is diagnostic of the species, although the prickliness usually disappears when the slug is preserved. Another useful character is a line of very small black dots along the margin of the sole at the anterior end, although they are not always apparent.

== Biology ==
This species occurs in natural habitat such as grasslands and forests, and on cultivated or otherwise human-altered land, such as pastures, orchards, and hedges. It feeds on plants and fungi.

For a long time, this hermaphroditic slug was thought to reproduce only by self-fertilization; solitary captive specimens produced offspring and the species had never been observed mating. Genetic analysis provided evidence of crossing and the species is now believed to have a mixed breeding system, with an individual having the ability to fertilize itself or cross-fertilize, exchanging sperm with a mate.

In the wild it has one generation per year (univoltine), with all individuals maturing rather synchronously in autumn. Adults die over winter or early spring.

== As a pest ==
This is not considered to be a severe pest, but some reports of such problems have been made. While most exotic slugs and snails are often found in altered environments, this species has a greater tendency to invade natural habitat, such as forests. Its ability to self-fertilize allows a single individual to enter new habitat and then reproduce. It is also known as a pest of clover-seeded pastures in New Zealand.
