= Heinrich Simroth =

German malacologist

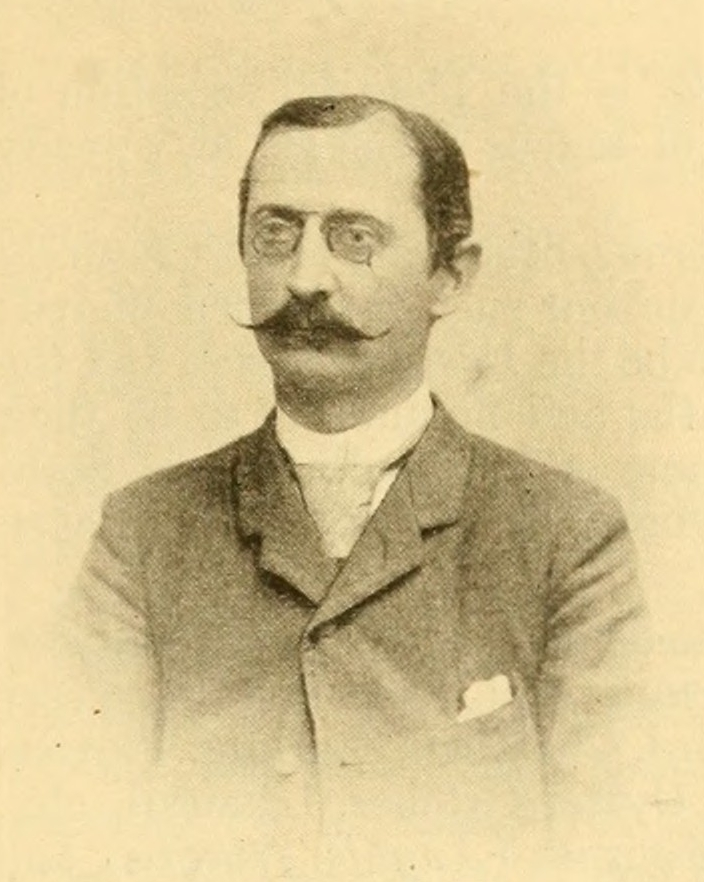
- Heinrich Simroth (1902)
- Born: 10 May 1851; Riestedt
- Died: 31 August 1917 (aged 66); Gautzsch near Leipzig
- Education: University of Leipzig
- Scientific career
- Fields: Malacology

Heinrich Rudolf Simroth (10 May 1851 Riestedt (now a part of Sangerhausen) – 31 August 1917 Gautzsch near Leipzig), was a German zoologist and malacologist. He was a professor of zoology in Leipzig.

Academic career: 1888–1917 University of Leipzig.

He was a specialist for slugs. He discovered and described various new species of slugs.

Species of animals named in honor of him include:

- Bulimulus simrothi (Reibisch, 1892) – snail
- Pseudaneitea simrothi (Suter, 1896) – slug
- Arion simrothi - slug
- Tapinoma simrothi Krausse, 1911 - ant
- Bipalium simrothi - planarian

It was thought that there is no collection by Simroth. His collection of type specimen of 43 slugs has been found Museum für Naturkunde in Berlin in 2010.

== Bibliography ==
- Simroth H. (1886). "Weitere Mittheilungen über palaearktische Nacktschnecken". Jahrbücher der Deutschen Malakozoologischen Gesellschaft 13: 16-34.
- Simroth H. (1891). "Die Nacktschnecken der portugiesisch-azorischen Fauna in ihrem Verhältnis zu denen der paläarktischen Region überhaupt". Nova Acta Academiae Caesareae Leopoldino-Carolinae Germanicae Naturae Curiosorum 56: [1], 201-424, Tab. IX-XVIII [= 9-18]. Halle.
- Simroth H. (1892). "Ueber die nackten Limaciden und Testacelliden des Kaukasus". Sitzungsberichte der naturforschenden Gesellschaft Leipzig: 40-49.
- Simroth H. (1892–1894). Chapters Polyplacophora, Amphineura and Scaphopoda. In: Bronn H. G. (1892–1894). Dr. H. G. Bronns Klassen und Ordnungen des Tierreichs. Band 3, Mollusca. Abteilung 1, Amphineura und Scaphopoda.
- Simroth H. (1894). "Ueber einige von Herrn Dr. Sturany auf der Balkanhalbinsel erbeutete Nacktschnecken". Annalen des kaiserlich-königlichen Naturhistorischen Hofmuseums 9 (3): 391-394, Taf. 19. Wien.
- Simroth H. (1896). "Über bekannte und neue Urocycliden". Abhandlungen der Senckenbergischen Naturforschenden Gesellschaft 19: 281–312.
- Simroth H. (1898). "Über die Gattung Limax in Russland". Ezhegodnik Zoologicheskogo Muzeya Imperatorskoi Akademii Nauk (Annuaire du Musée Zoologique de l'Académie Impériale des Sciences de St.-Pétersbourg) 3: 52-57.
- Simroth H. (1901). Die Nacktschnecken des Russischen Reiches. St.-Petersburg. 321 pp.
- Simroth H. (1910). "Kaukasische und asiatische Limaciden und Raublungenschnecken". Ezhegodnik Zoologicheskogo Muzeya Imperatorskoi Akademii Nauk (Annuaire du Musée Zoologique de l'Académie Impériale des Sciences de St.-Pétersbourg) 15: 499-560.
- Simroth H. (1910). Lissopode Nacktschnecken von Madagaskar, den Comoren und Mauritius. Unter Berücksichtigung verwandter Arten. In: Reise in Ostafrika in den Jahren 1903–1905. Wissenschaftliche Ergebnisse, 2 (A. Voeltzkow, ed.), 576–622. Schweizerbart, Stuttgart.
- Simroth H. (1912). Neue Beiträge zur Kenntnis der kaukasischen Nacktschneckenfauna. St. Petersburg (Russia), Izvestiya Kavkazskago Muzeya 6: 1-140.
- Simroth H. (1914). "Beitrag zur Kentniss der Nacktschnecken Columbiens zugleich eine Uebersicht über die neotropische Nacktschnecken-Fauna überhaupt". Mémoires de la Société des Sciences naturelles de Neuchatel 5: 270–341. Tables XI-XIV.
