= Mario Lessona =

Italian zoologist (1855-1911)

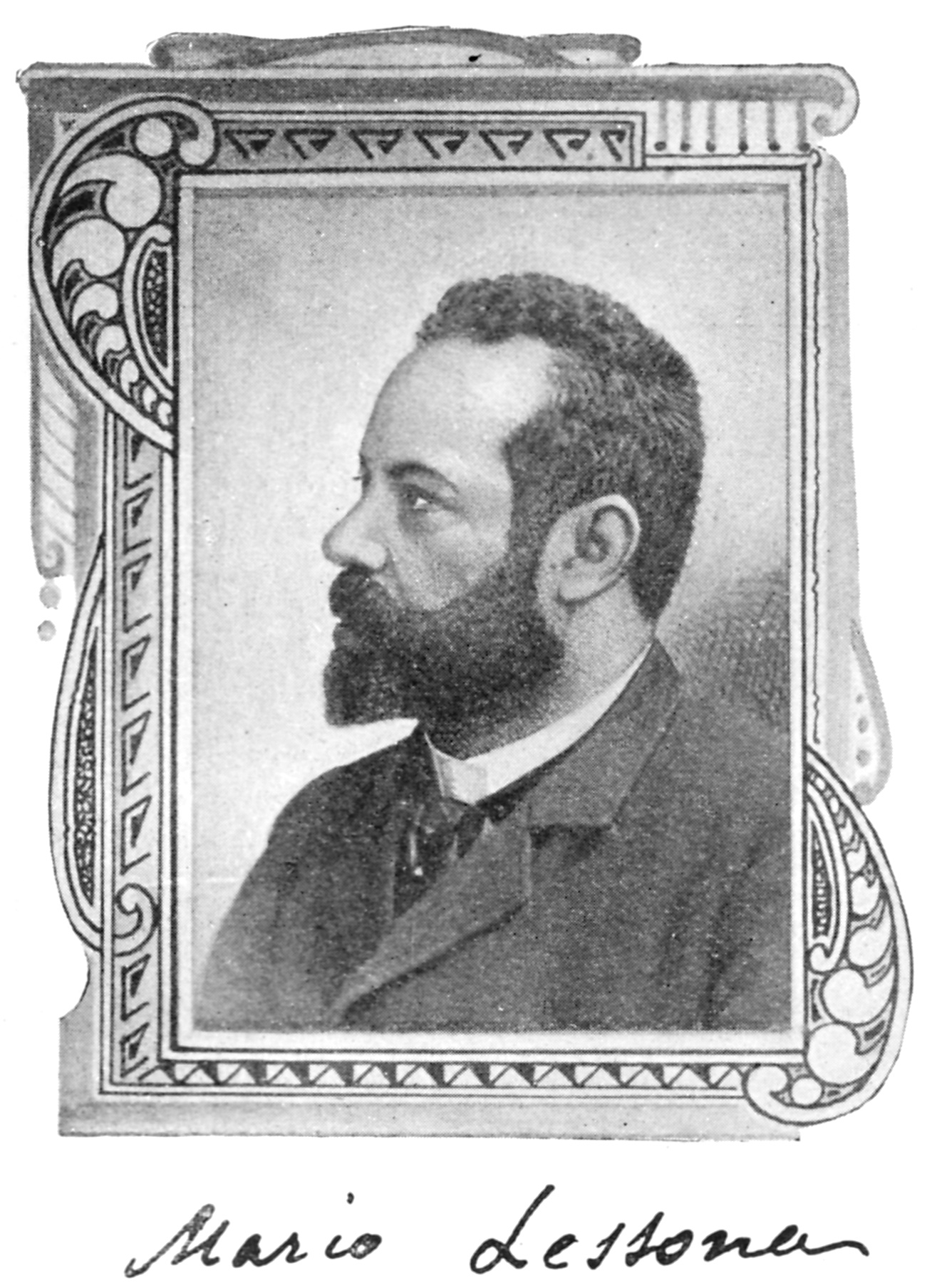
Portrait and signature, on p. 151 of Taylor (1904)

Mario Lessona (18 December 1855 in Genoa – 25 December 1911 in Turin) was an Italian zoologist and malacologist. He was the son of the prominent natural scientist and senator Michele Lessona and his wife Adele Masi Lessona, who was very much involved in her husband's work, particularly in making translations. A son of Adele Lessona by an earlier marriage was the painter and malacologist Carlo Pollonera, with whom Mario published a monograph on Italian slugs. Mario also coauthored various scientific works with his brother-in-law, the zoologist and senator Lorenzo Camerano.

== Biography ==
In the 1880s, Lessona was an assistant professor of zoology at the University of Messina, and then a teacher of natural history at secondary schools in Venice and Carmagnola. In the 1890s he worked as a teacher in the Fornaris-Morocco boarding school in Turin. He published on malacology and comparative anatomy, as well as writing several books of natural history and geography for schools. He also edited and translated further scientific works.

== Taxa ==
Taxa named by Lessona include:

- Ariunculus Lessona, 1881
- Tandonia Lessona & Pollonera, 1882
- Ariunculus isselii Lessona & Pollonera, 1882
- Ariunculus speziae Lessona, 1881
- Deroceras panormitanum (Lessona & Pollonera, 1882)
- Falkneria camerani (Lessona, 1880)
- Lehmannia melitensis (Lessona & Pollonera, 1882)
- Lehmannia rupicola Lessona & Pollonera, 1882
- Limax subalpinus Lessona, 1880
- Limax veronensis Lessona & Pollonera, 1882
- Phenacolimax stabilei (Lessona, 1880)
