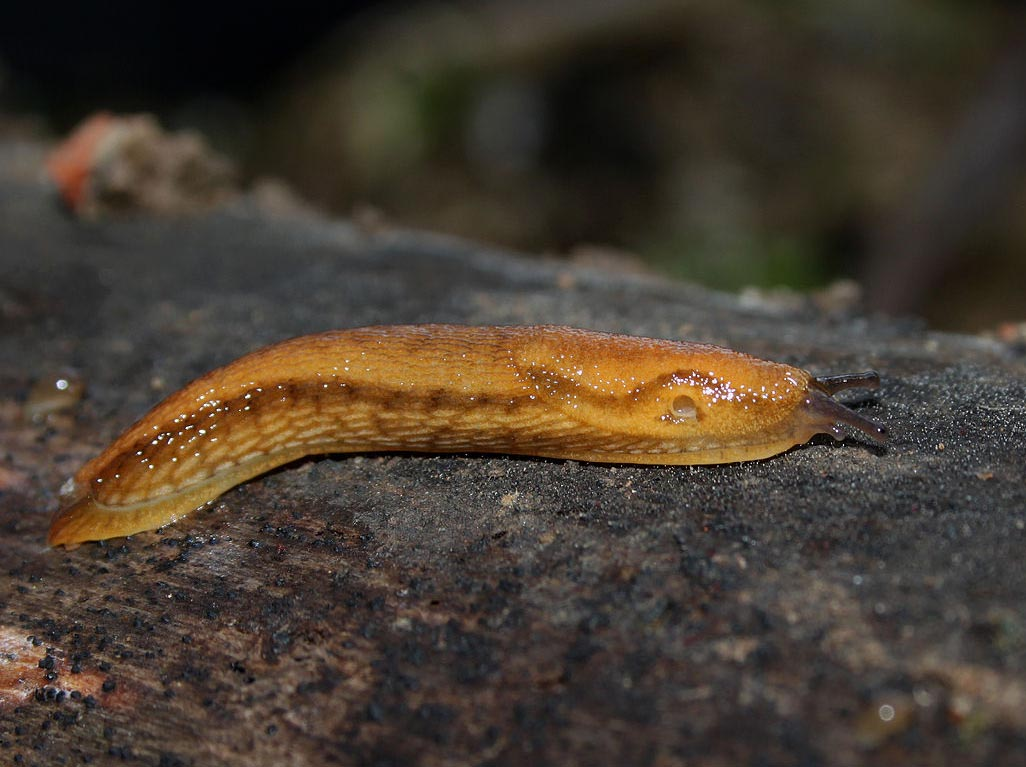

Conservation status
- Least Concern (IUCN 3.1)

- Secure (NatureServe)

Scientific classification
- Kingdom: Animalia
- Phylum: Mollusca
- Class: Gastropoda
- Order: Stylommatophora
- Family: Arionidae
- Genus: Arion
- Species: A. subfuscus

Binomial name
- Arion subfuscus (Draparnaud), 1805)

Synonyms
- Arion (Mesarion) subfuscus (Draparnaud, 1805) alternative representation; Arion subfuscus var. cinereofuscus (Draparnaud, 1805) (variety); Arion subfuscus var. fennicus Simroth, 1902 (junior synonym); Limax subfuscus Draparnaud, 1805 (original combination); Limax subfuscus var. cinereo-fuscus Draparnaud, 1805 (junior synonym)

= Arion subfuscus =

Species of gastropod

Arion subfuscus, sometimes colloquially called the western dusky slug, is a species of land slug. It forms a species complex with Arion fuscus.

== Description ==
The species is elongated and moderately thick. Its mantle is slightly humped in the front. The neck is rather short, as are the oral tentacles. The eyestalks are thick at their base and taper toward the top, which is globulous (or swollen). They are blackish, as is the upper part of the head, which is crossed by four longitudinal stripes. The mantle is granular, and the back is strewn with interwoven ridges. The underside of the slug is whitish, and yellowish in the middle. The edge of the foot is grey and marked with small transverse black lines. Present at the tail are overlapping lamellae (plates or folds). The colour of this species varies. The mantle and the upper side of the body are always a fairly dark brown, and there is a black band on each side of both the mantle and the body.

However, variety α is coloured with a reddish tint, which is much more noticeable toward the middle of the mantle, and especially on each side of the body below the two black bands. In contrast, in variety β, the tint is ashen or greyish, against which the blackish network formed by the interwoven ridges stands out on each side of the body.

== Distribution ==
It is native to Eurasia, and has been introduced to eastern North America.
