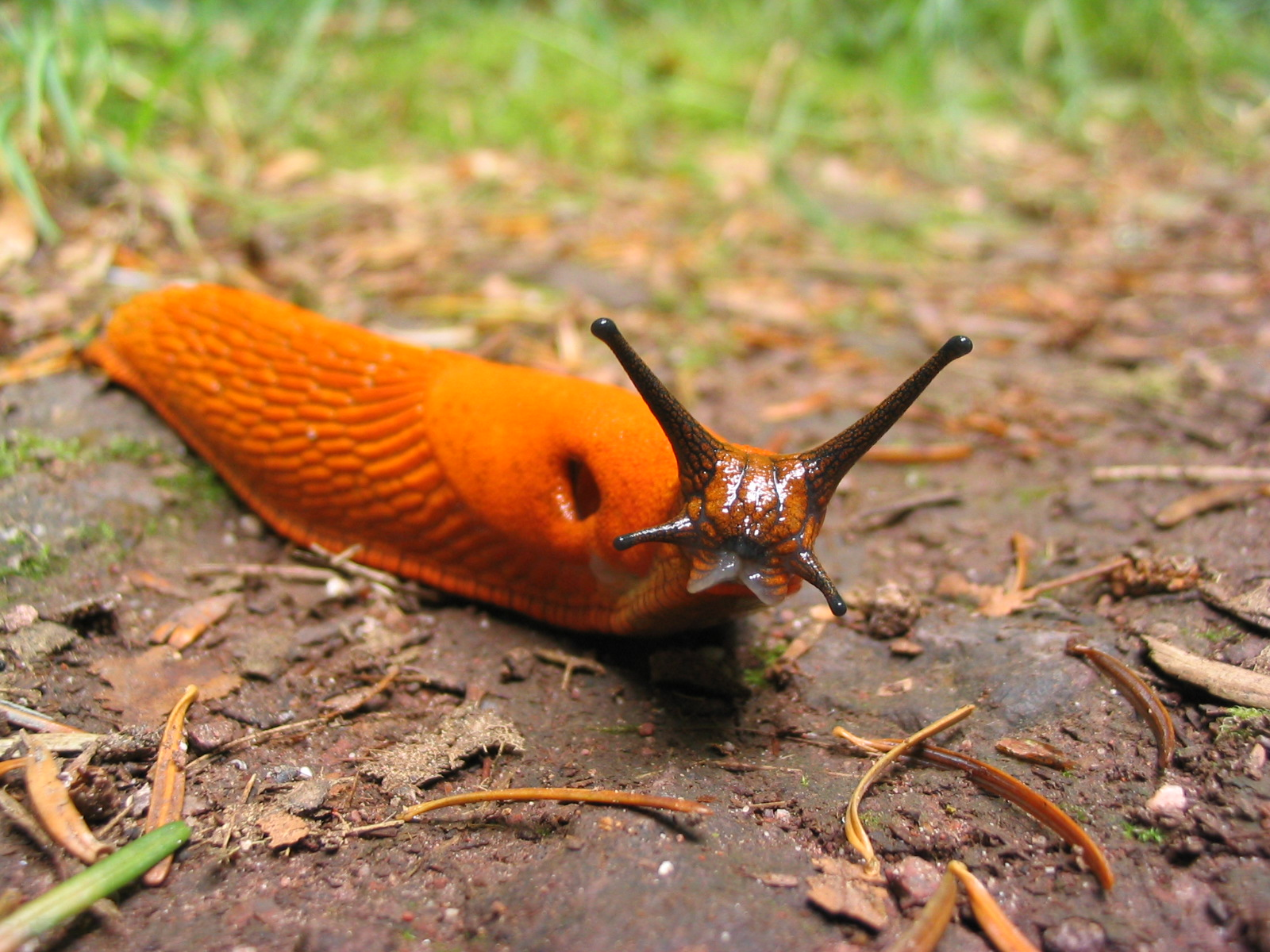
- Arion ater rufus

Scientific classification
- Kingdom: Animalia
- Phylum: Mollusca
- Class: Gastropoda
- Order: Stylommatophora
- Family: Arionidae
- Genus: Arion; A. Férussac, 1819

Type species
- Arion empiricorum A. Férussac, 1819

Synonyms
- Arion (Arion) A. Férussac, 1819 alternative representation; Arion (Carinarion) P. Hesse, 1926 alternative representation; Arion (Carinella) Mabille, 1870 (invalid; preoccupied); Arion (Kobeltia) Seibert, 1873 alternative representation; Arion (Lochea) Moquin-Tandon, 1855 junior subjective synonym; Arion (Mesarion) P. Hesse, 1926 alternative representation; Arion (Microarion) P. Hesse, 1926 alternative representation; Arion (Prolepis) Moquin-Tandon, 1855; Baudonia Mabille, 1868 junior subjective synonym; Carinella Mabille, 1870 (Invalid: junior homonym of Carinella Johnston, 1833 [Nemertea] and Carinella G.B. Sowerby II, 1839); Macroarion P. Hesse, 1926 unavailable name; Microarion P. Hesse, 1926; Tetraspis Hagenmüller, 1885

= Arion (gastropod) =

Genus of gastropods

Arion is a genus of air-breathing land slugs in the family Arionidae, the roundback slugs.

Most species of this Palearctic genus are native to the Iberian Peninsula.

Species can be difficult to distinguish from one another upon cursory examination, because individuals of a species can vary in color and there are few obvious differences between taxa. The color of an individual can be influenced by its diet.

Some Arion are known as pests, such as A. lusitanicus auct. non Mabille (= A. vulgaris), which damages agricultural crops and ornamental plants, and A. rufus, a familiar garden pest. Arion slugs are often transported internationally in shipments of plant products and mushrooms. Arion slugs have been identified in North America and Australia as invasive species, altering the plants of ecosystems through seed predation and competing with native slugs.

== Species ==
There are over 40 species in the genus.

Species include:

- Arion amygdaliformis Castillejo, Baselga, Lorenzo-Carballa, Iglesias & Gomez-Rodriguez, 2024
- Arion anthracius Bourguignat, 1866
- Arion ater (Linnaeus, 1758) – black slug
  - Arion ater rufus (Linnaeus, 1758) – red slug
- Arion atripunctatus Dumont & Mortillet, 1853
- Arion baeticus Garrido, Castillejo & Iglesias, 1994
- Arion circumscriptus Johnston, 1828 – brown-banded arion
- Arion distinctus Mabille, 1868 – darkface arion
- Arion euthymeanus Florence, 1886
- Arion fagophilus de Winter, 1986
- Arion fasciatus (Nilsson, 1823) – orange-banded arion
- Arion flagellus Collinge, 1893
- Arion fuligineus Morelet, 1845
- Arion fuscus (O.F.Müller, 1774)
- Arion gilvus Torres Mínguez, 1925
- Arion hispanicus Simroth, 1886
- Arion hortensis Férussac, 1819 – small striped slug
- Arion intermedius Normand, 1852 (syn. Arion alpinus Pollonera, 1887) – hedgehog slug
- Arion iratii Garrido, Castillejo & Iglesias, 1995
- Arion lizarrustii Garrido, Castillejo & Iglesias, 1995
- Arion luisae Borrèda & Martínez-Ortí, 2014
- Arion lusitanicus Mabille, 1868
- Arion magnus Torres Mínguez, 1923
- Arion molinae Garrido, Castillejo & Iglesias, 1995
- Arion nobrei Pollonera, 1889
- Arion obesoductus (syn. Arion alpinus auctt. non Pollonera, 1887)
- Arion occultus R.Anderson, 2004
- Arion owenii Davies, 1979 – warty arion
- Arion paularensis Wiktor & Parejo, 1989
- Arion ponsi Quintana, 2007
- Arion sibiricus Simroth, 1902
- Arion simrothi Künkel, 1909: synonym of Arion (Mesarion) simrothi Künkel, 1909 (uncertain > taxon inquirendum, subgeneric affiliation unclear)
- Arion subfuscus (Draparnaud, 1805) – dusky arion
- Arion timidus Morelet, 1845
- Arion torquiformis Castillejo, Baselga, Lorenzo-Carballa, Iglesias & Gomez-Rodriguez, 2024
- Arion transsylvanus Simroth, 1885
- Arion urbiae de Winter, 1986
- Arion vulgaris Moquin-Tandon, 1855 (also referred to as Arion lusitanicus auct. non Mabille) – Spanish slug
- Arion wiktori Parejo & R. Martín, 1990

=== Synonyms ===
- Arion alpinus Pollonera, 1887: synonym of Arion intermedius Normand, 1852 (junior subjective synonym)
- Arion andersonii J. G. Cooper, 1872: synonym of Prophysaon andersonii (J. G. Cooper, 1872) (superseded combination)
- Arion anguloi Martín & B. Gómez, 1988: synonym of Arion urbiae de Winter, 1986 (a suggested synonym)
- Arion aterrimus L. Pfeiffer & J. E. Gray, 1855: synonym of Oopelta aterrima (L. Pfeiffer & J. E. Gray, 1855) (original combination)
- Arion austeniana G. Nevill, 1880 (nomen nudum)
- Arion coerulens Collinge, 1897: synonym of Arion distinctus Mabille, 1868
- Arion cottianus Pollonera, 1889: synonym of Arion distinctus Mabille, 1868
- Arion elongatus Collinge, 1894: synonym of Arion hortensis A. Férussac, 1819
- Arion empiricorum A. Férussac, 1819: synonym of Arion ater (Linnaeus, 1758) (junior subjective synonym)
- Arion foliolatus A. Gould, 1851: synonym of Prophysaon foliolatum (A. Gould, 1851) (original combination)
- Arion hessei Simroth, 1894: synonym of Arion distinctus Mabille, 1868
- † Arion hochheimensis Wenz, 1911 (apparently no gastropod but calcareous excretions of Lumbricidae)
- † Arion kinkelini Wenz, 1911 (apparently no gastropod but calcareous excretions of Lumbricidae)
- Arion minimus Simroth, 1885: synonym of Arion distinctus Mabille, 1868
- Arion mollerii Pollonera, 1889: synonym of Arion distinctus Mabille, 1868
- Arion rubellus Sterki, 1911: synonym of Arion hortensis A. Férussac, 1819 (junior synonym)
- Arion rufus (Linnaeus, 1758): synonym of Arion ater rufus (Linnaeus, 1758) (superseded rank)
- Arion silvaticus Lohmander, 1937: synonym of Arion circumscriptus silvaticus Lohmander, 1937 (superseded rank)
- Arion sulcatus Morelet, 1845: synonym of Arion ater (Linnaeus, 1758) (junior subjective synonym)
- Arion vejdovskyi Babor & Koštál, 1893 : synonym of Arion distinctus Mabille, 1868
- Arion vejdowskyi Babor & Koštál, 1893 : synonym of Arion distinctus Mabille, 1868
- Arion vejdorskyi : synonym of Arion (Microarion) vejdowskyi Babor & Koštál, 1893: synonym of Arion distinctus Mabille, 1868
- Arion verrucosus Brevière, 1881: synonym of Arion intermedius Normand, 1852

== Etymology ==
The name Arion is in reference to Aelion's De Natura Animalium, which features a story about areíones - snails which leave their shells behind to feed, thus outsmarting predators who attack the empty shells.

== Mentioning in literature and folklore ==
- Larger Arion slugs frequently appear in various forms of traditional culture, including folk traditions, children's rhymes, and historical documentation of their practical uses.
- In pre-industrial Sweden, there are historical accounts, like the one in Lorens Wolter Rothof's 1762 book, detailing the unusual practice of using the black slug (Arion ater) as a source of grease to lubricate wooden wagon axles.
