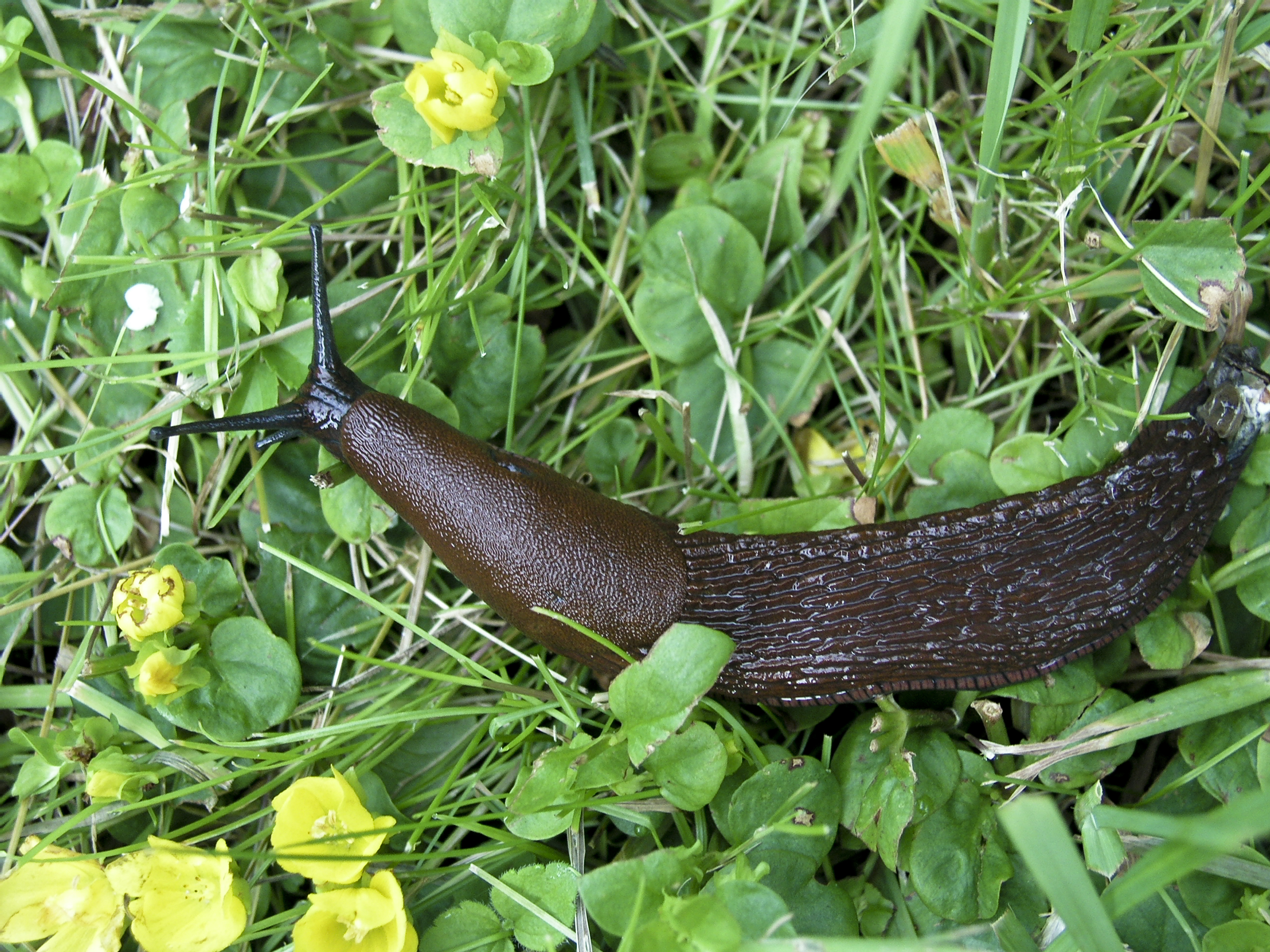
- A live individual of the Spanish slug Arion vulgaris, in the wild

Scientific classification
- Domain: Eukaryota
- Kingdom: Animalia
- Phylum: Mollusca
- Class: Gastropoda
- Order: Stylommatophora
- Superfamily: Arionoidea
- Family: Arionidae; J.E. Gray, 1840

Synonyms
- Tetraspididae Hagenmüller, 1885

= Arionidae =

Arionidae Temporal range: Miocene–Recent

Family of gastropods

Arionidae, common name the "roundback slugs" or "round back slugs" are a taxonomic family of air-breathing land slugs, terrestrial pulmonate gastropod mollusks in the superfamily Arionoidea.

== Distribution ==
The distribution of this family of slugs includes Nearctic, Palearctic and Oriental regions.

== Anatomy ==
Unlike some slugs, European Arionidae have no keel on the back. The caudal mucous pit is above the tip of the tail. The respiratory pore (pneumostome) is in front of the midpoint of the mantle. The body length is up to 250 mm. The mantle covers only a part of the body and lies in the anterior part.

The jaw is odontognathic, which means it is transversally ribbed. Radular teeth include: central tricuspid, lateral bi- or tricuspid, marginal bicuspid, all having broad bases. Teeth are often accreted. The digestive system forms 2 loops. The heart, in relation to body axis, is titled to the left. The kidney is circular (surrounding aorta). Cephalic retractors tend to divide into separate branches attached independently to the posterior part of pallial complex. The shell is strongly reduced in places, most often completely buried in the mantle, usually of loose crystals or plate-like. Genitalia: the penis is present only in some species, epiphallus is present in nearly all of them. Male copulatory organs are generally reduced, their role being taken over by a well-developed atrium and the epiphallus that produces spermatophores.

In this family, the number of haploid chromosomes lies between 21 and 30 (according to the values in this table).

== Genera ==
Family Arionidae has no subfamilies according to the taxonomy of the Gastropoda by Bouchet & Rocroi, 2005.

The type genus of the family is Arion Férussac, 1819

Genera within the family Arionidae include:

- Anadenulus Cockerell, 1890
- Arion Férussac, 1819
- Ariunculus Lessona, 1881
- Carinacauda Leonard, Chichester, Richart & Young, 2011
- Geomalacus Allman, 1843
- Gliabates Webb, 1959
- Hesperarion Simroth, 1891
- Letourneuxia Bourguignat, 1866
- Magnipelta Pilsbry, 1953
- Securicauda Leonard, Chichester, Richart & Young, 2011
- Udosarx Webb, 1959
- Zacoleus Pilsbry, 1903

== Parasites ==
The parasites of the Arionidae slugs include the Sciomyzidae.
