= António Costa (disambiguation) =

António Costa (born 1961) is a former prime minister of Portugal and president of the European Council.

António Costa may also refer to:

- António Bernardo da Costa Cabral, 1st Marquis of Tomar (1803–1889), Portuguese statesman
- Antonio Costa (painter) (1847–1915), Italian painter
- Antonio Maria Costa (born 1941), Italian economist
- António Costa Silva (born 1952), Portuguese professor of engineering, businessman and politician
- António Costa Pinto (born 1953), Portuguese political scientist
- António Félix da Costa (born 1991), Portuguese racing driver
- António Luís Costa (born 1953), Portuguese serial killer
- Luis Antonio Costa (born 1953), Argentine field hockey player
- Marcos Antônio Costa "Preto" (born 1978), Brazilian footballer
- Yuri Antonio Costa da Silva (born 1996), Brazilian footballer
- Antonio Costa (geophysicist), Italian geophysicist and volcanologist
