= Carlo Pollonera =

Italian painter and malacologist

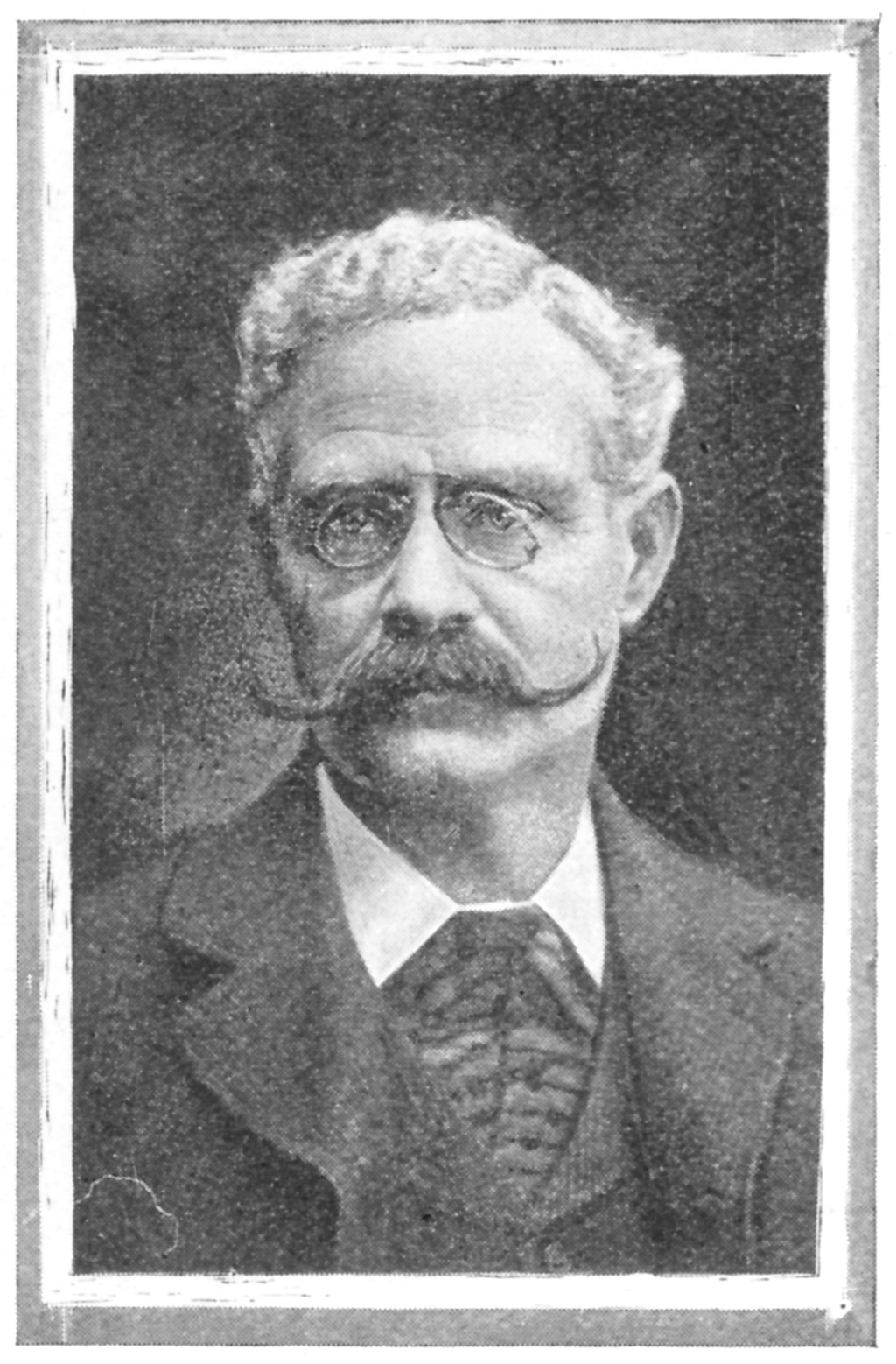
Portrait on p. 162 of Taylor (1905)

Carlo Pollonera (March 27, 1849 – June 17, 1923) was an Italian painter, particularly of landscapes, and also an important malacologist.

== Biography ==
Carlo Pollonera was born in Alexandria, Egypt, where his father, Giovanni B. Pollonera, was a lawyer. He died when Carlo was a child, after which his mother returned to Italy (Genoa) and remarried. As a seventeen-year-old, Carlo fought with Garibaldi on the Trentino campaign of 1866. In 1865, the family had moved to Turin, where Pollonera began studying painting with Alberto Maso Gilli. He enrolled at the Accademia Albertina and studied under Enrico Gamba and Andrea Gastaldi. Pollonera was a rebellious pupil, wanting to paint exactly what he saw, rather than, for instance, changing a distracting background. This principle not to improve on what he saw remained a hallmark of his painting throughout Pollonera's career. After four years with Gastaldi, in 1873 he switched to study in the private school of Antonio Fontanesi. In January 1875, he travelled with his close friend Carlo Stratta to Paris, where he studied under Thomas Couture and was influenced by the Barbizon school. Other visits were to Milan in 1874 and to Rome between 1900 and 1912, where he associated with Antonio Mancini, Pietro Canonica and John Singer Sargent. His Card Players, one of his first works, was exhibited at the 1873 Promotrice of Turin, where he subsequently exhibited regularly. Among his works are: Canavese; Aprile; Le oche; Tranquillità; Il ballo; La mestizia; Terrena fiorito, and Il Malone. In 1882, he exhibited the life-size portrait of Il seminatore. Some of his paintings are nowadays valued at thousands, or even tens of thousands, of euros.

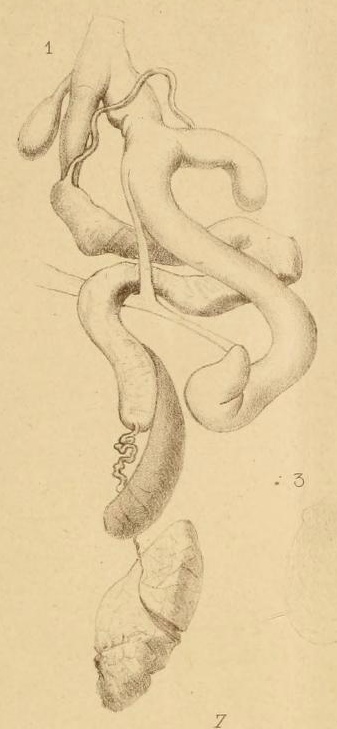
Slug genitalia drawn by Pollonera illustrating an article

As a child, Pollonera had become the stepson of the prominent natural scientist and senator Michele Lessona, whose second wife (Pollonera's mother, Adele Masi Lessona) and children were much involved in his scientific output, particularly the translations. Although Pollonera had started to study natural sciences, he soon switched to painting. Nevertheless, from 1882 to 1916 Pollonera wrote over 50 scientific articles on non-marine molluscs. See his bibliography page. Most articles were written in Italian for Italian journals, but there were also instance of articles written in French, English, Portuguese and German for journals of those countries. His peak output was in the decade 1884–1893, when working on the fauna of Italy and adjacent areas; only 16 articles appeared after 1898, when his attention shifted more to the fauna of Africa. Pollonera's first publication was a monograph on Italian slugs in conjunction with his younger half-brother Mario Lessona, but subsequently he was always the sole author. However, the section below on taxa named after Pollonera provides many examples of generous cooperation with other scientists, sometimes authoring species descriptions in other's papers or drawing the plates. Whilst some of his papers are collections of brief notes about disparate topics, others are authoritative monographs about particular taxa. His obituarist Colosi points out that his thorough and keenly-observed species descriptions were appreciated even by those who disagreed with his conclusions about the systematics. His skill as an artist is also apparent in the plates illustrating his articles (see examples below). One particularly important aspect of his research is that he dissected the animals to provide extra anatomical characters; this has since become standard but was "cutting-edge" at the time. This approach is particularly valuable in studying slugs, which was the group that he published most on, although others of his papers concern terrestrial snails and occasionally freshwater and fossil faunas. His collection is in the Museo Regionale di Scienze Naturale di Torino.

For 20 years Pollonera was in a relationship with a pianist, whose name is now lost; this was one reason that he remained in Turin. But in 1913 Pollonera married Ulma de'Bartolomeis (1886–1981), 37 years his junior, who had taken private painting classes with him. They are known sometimes to have worked on the same canvas together. There was just one daughter, Sabina (1914–1996). Carlo Pollonera died on 17 June 1923 after a short stay in the San Giovanni hospital in Turin.

Pollonera was not a practising Christian but believed in a superior being. Marziano Bernardi summarised his character as, "silent and a loner by nature, a rebel and intransigent" ["un silenzioso e un solitario per temperamento, un ribelle e un intransigente"]. One striking anecdote is that comments of literary critic and painter Enrico Thovez about the perspective of one of Pollonera's paintings led to Pollonera proposing a duel. Instead the matter was settled in court, and the two protagonists later made up.

== Bibliography ==
A full bibliography of Carlo Pollonera appears as a separate page.

== Taxa named after Pollonera ==
The list of taxa that have been named after Pollonera documents not only the esteem in which he was held but also the milieu of his scientific contacts as his influence spread.

The first to name a species after Pollonera was his half-brother Mario Lessona, who described the land snail Clausilia pollonerae in 1880. The only locality he listed is one reported by Pollonera. The name is now considered a synonym of Charpentieria dyodon thomasiana.

In 1884, the geologist Federico Sacco named a Pliocene freshwater snail Viviparus pollonerae, dedicated to this "kind and talented malacologist" ("al gentile quanto valente malacologo"). Sacco also acknowledged Pollonera's help with his work: the two were contemporaries in Turin. In 1886, Sacco named a species of slug known only from its fossil shell (Miocene) as Limax pollonerae after his colleague who "so lovingly deals with the study of Limacidae" ("con tanto amore si occupa dello studio dei Limacidi"). The same year, Sacco coined the name Polloneria for a subgenus of the land snail genus Clausilia, naming it after "one of the most illustrious Italian malacologists"; Polloneria has since been raised to the rank of genus and given rise to the name of the tribe Polloneriini. In the same article Sacco described Ferussacia Pollonerae. Other colleagues in Turin were responsible for the only two non-molluscan species named after Pollonera. In 1896, Achille Griffini named an orthopteran from Central America Cocconotus Pollonerae (now in the genus Eubliastes). And in 1912, Lorenzo Camerano named a horsehair worm Chordodes pollonerae; Camerano was originally, like Pollonera, a painter, who had become a protégé of Pollonera's step-father Michele Lessona, eventually taking his place as head of the Turin museum, becoming a senator, and also marrying Pollonera's half sister Luigia.

Meanwhile, Napoleone Pini, based in Milan, had named two species after Pollonera in different 1885 articles printed in the same volume: one was the snail Pupa pollonerae (now Orcula spoliata) and the other the slug Arion pollonerae. In the first case, it was Pollonera who had passed on the specimens of the "new" species to Pini and, in the second, he had drawn the plates illustrating the article. In 1888, another Italian malacologist Giorgio R. Sulliotti, used the name Polloneria for a genus of sea butterfly. As Sacco had used the name already, this new use was invalid and the older name Heliconoides is used today. A year later Sulliotti named a marine bivalve from Sardinia Tapes Pollonerianus in honour of Pollonera "to whom we owe the most recent and best study of the malacological fauna of Piedmont, and with whose friendship I am honored". Sullioti compared this form with the common Ruditapes decussatus, from which it is not now distinguished.

Pollonera's work and reputation had now begun to spread beyond Italy. In 1889, the German slug specialist Heinrich Simroth named a species of slug from Palermo Agriolimax Pollonerae. This is today considered a synonym of Deroceras panormitanum, which Mario Lessona and Pollonera had already described in 1882, also from Palermo. In 1890, another German, Karl Flach, better known as an entomologist, named a variety of Pupa biplicata as "Pollonerae", having discussed Pollonera's recent work on this species. The Swedish malacologist Carl Westerlund in 1892 named a soil-living snail from Malta Cionella pollonerae; this is today considered a synonym of Cecilioides acicula. In 1895, the British malacologists Walter Collinge and Haversham Godwin-Austen named a semi-slug from Borneo as Microparmarion pollonerai after "the distinguished Italian malacologist".

Two expeditions led by Borelli to Paraguay and Argentina yielded mollusc collections that Giuseppe Paravicini (of Milan) and then César Ancey (working in Algeria) wrote up in 1894 and 1897. Each named a snail species after Pollonera: Helix Pollonerae (now in the genus Epiphragmophora) and Bulimulus Pollonerae. Ancey thanked Pollonera for having directed the collection to him.

In 1897, the cleric and malacologist Pietro Arbanasich (using the pseudonym Fra Piero) authored the description of a species of semi-slug from Sardinia under the name Vitrina Polloneriana. Really, Pollonera himself wrote and illustrated the description, and one might suppose that the naming was Arbanasich's way of thanking him. Current names in use for this species are Oligolimax pollonerianus and Sardovitrina polloneriana.

In his large 1903 monograph on the Corsican non-marine mollusc fauna, the French soldier-turned-malacologist Eugène Caziot named a variety of Helix raspaili as pollonerae (now Tacheocampylaea acropachia pollonerae), acknowledging the considerable help of the "Italian dissector". The collaboration was close enough that Pollonera is given as the authority for another new species described in the work.

The leading North American malacologist Henry Pilsbry named two species after Pollonera in his major 1919 work on molluscs from the Belgian Congo, the slug Trichotoxon pollonerae and the snail Gulella polloneriana. The latter was most likely so named because of its resemblance to G. camerani, which had been described by Pollonera. Ptchotrema pollonerae is another species of landsnail from the Belgian Congo, this one named in 1913 by Hugh Berthon Preston, a shell dealer in London who "realized the market value of new names".

Pollonera was commemorated even after his death. In 1939, Polloneria was used a third time, this time by Alonza and Alonza Bissachi, for a subgenus of unrelated hygromiid snails, The next year, to avoid the homonym, they replaced the name with Polloneriella. Polloneriella is nowadays sometimes considered as a montoypic genus or sometimes considered a subgenus of Xerosecta.

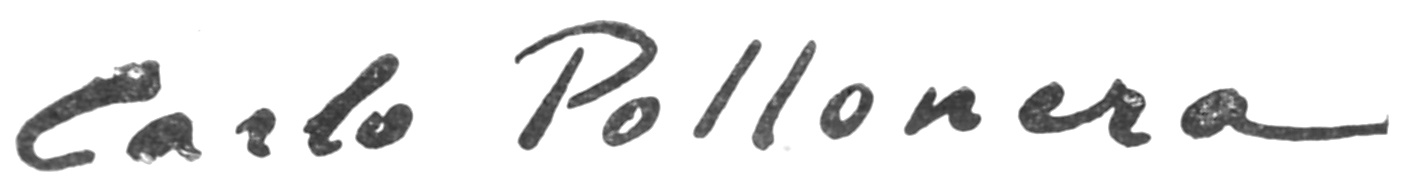
Signature: p. 162 of Taylor (1905). See for other examples.

== Galleries ==
=== Some paintings by Pollonera in the Galleria Civica d’Arte Moderna e Contemporanea, Turin ===
Titles and dates follow those listed by Aldo Picco

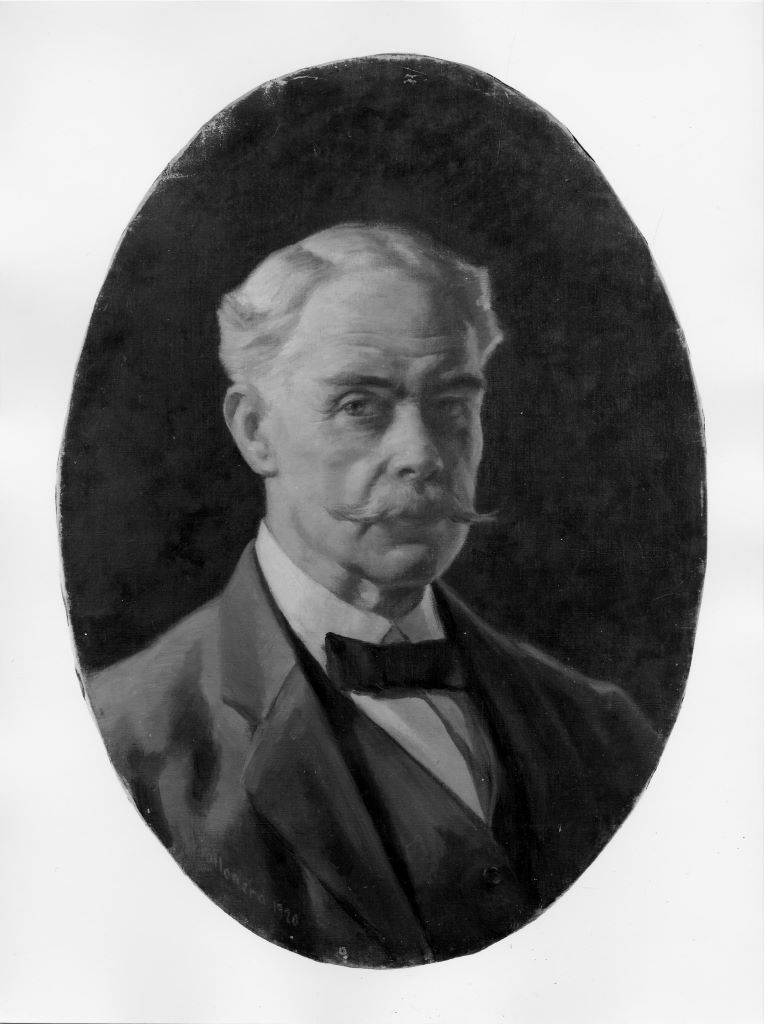
Self portrait, 1920

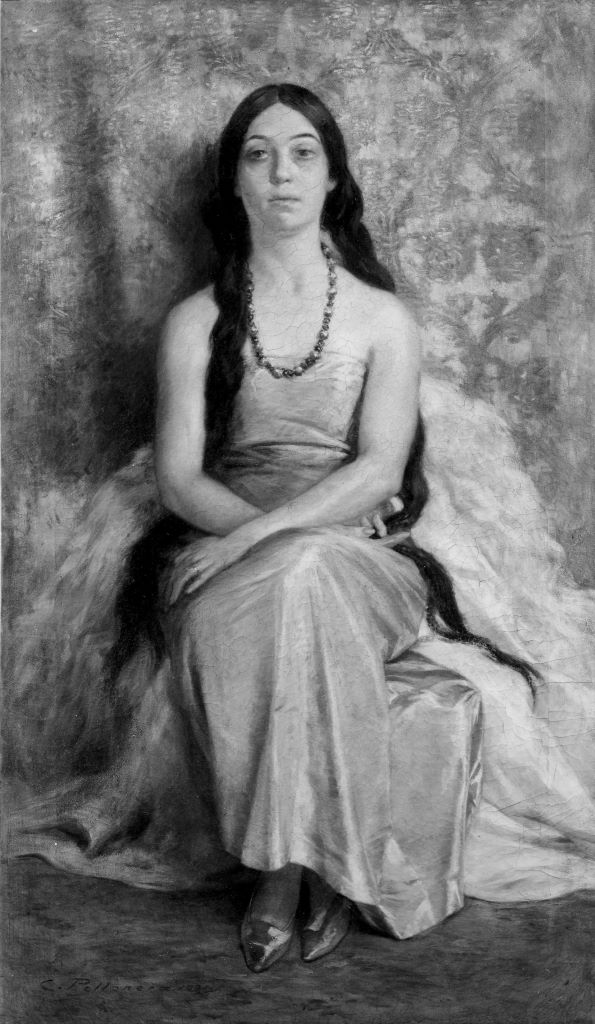
Ritratto della moglie in abito verde (Portrait of his wife in green dress), 1921

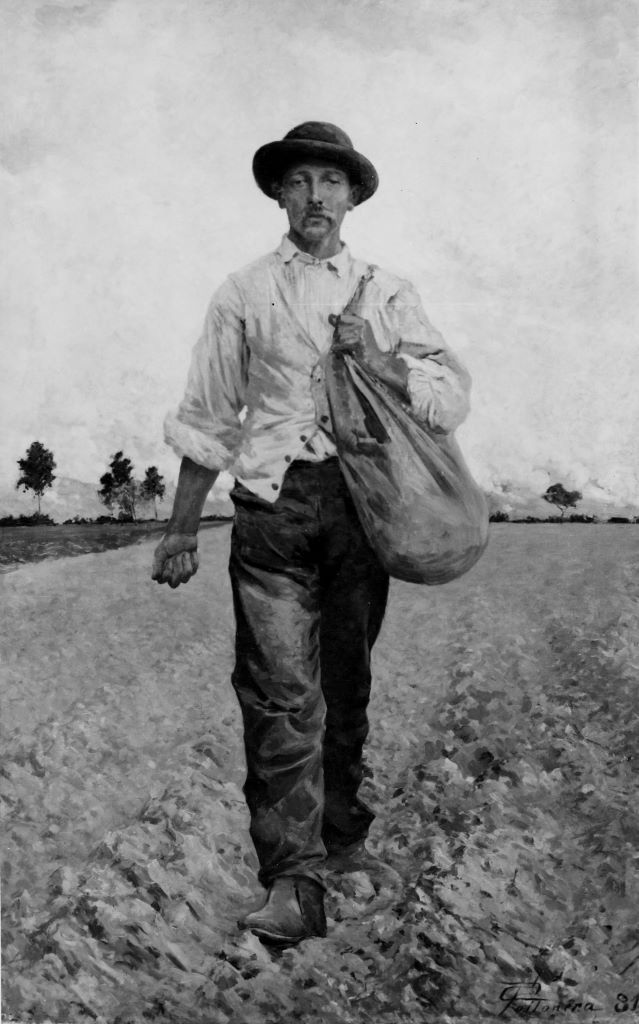
Il seminatore (The sower), 1881
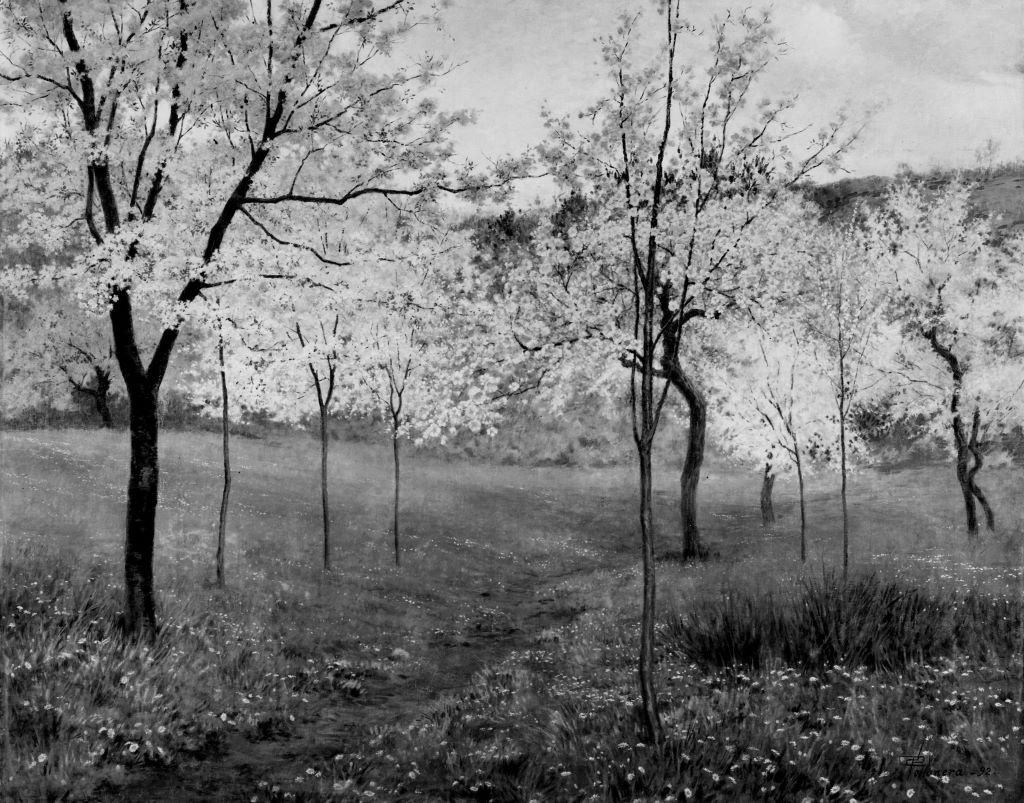
Primavera: Peschi fioriti (Spring: flowering peach trees), 1892

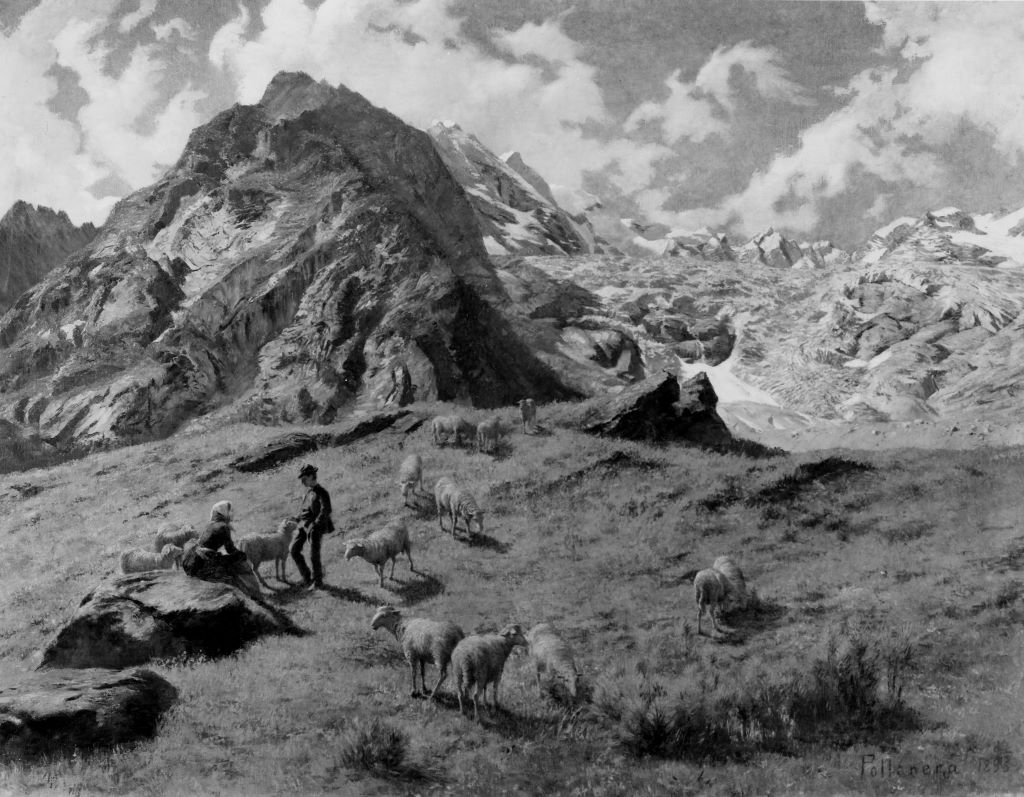
Paesaggio di Val Veny, Courmayeur: alti pascoli (Landscape of Val Veny, Courmayeur: high pastures), 1896

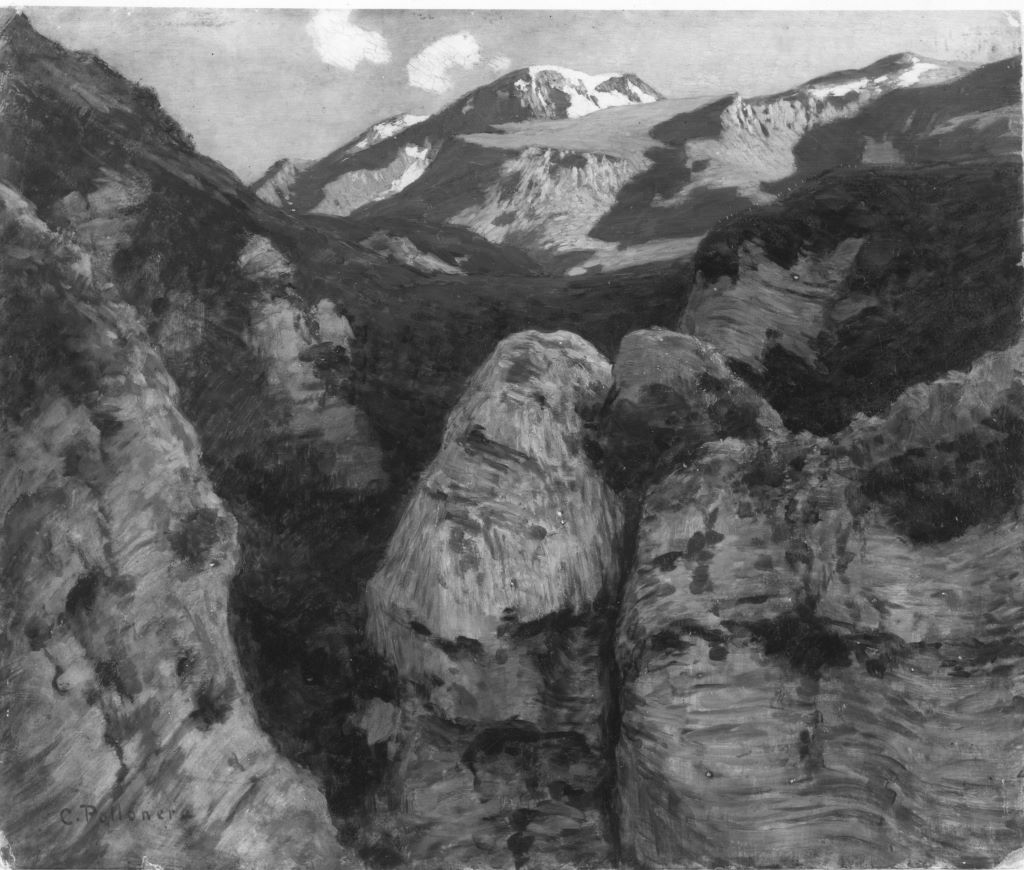
I due amanti: Rocce al Cenisio (The two lovers: rocks at Cenisio), c. 1910
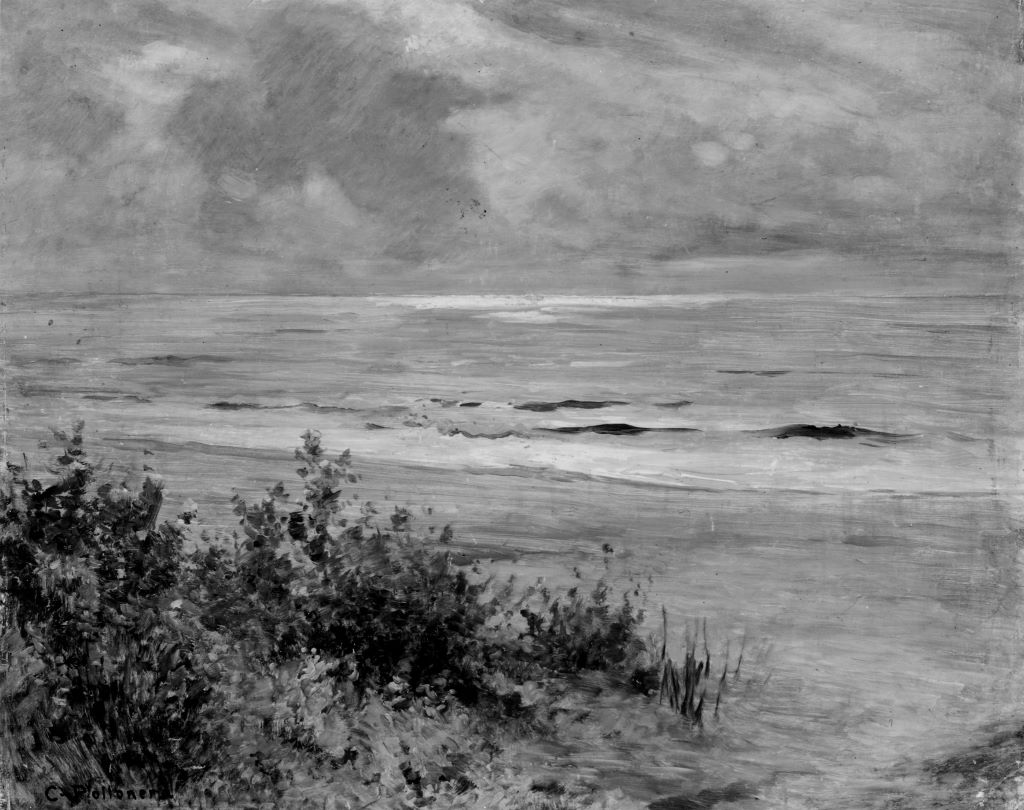
Marina grigia ad Alassio (Grey seascape at Alassio), c. 1917

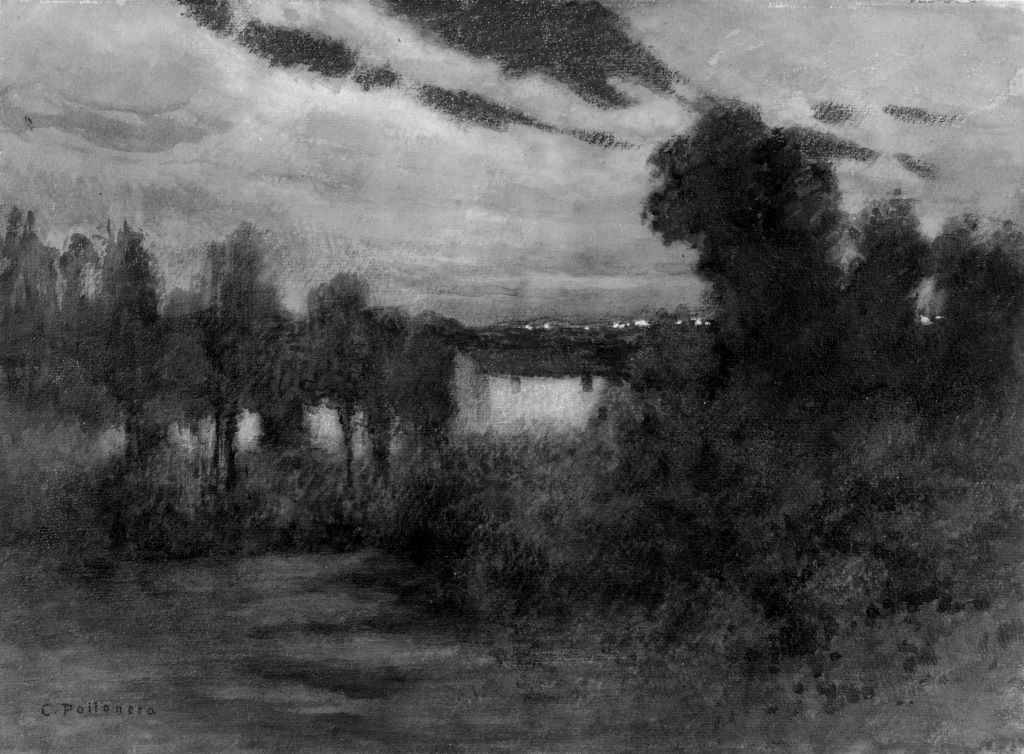
Notturno a Roma (Night in Rome), c. 1913

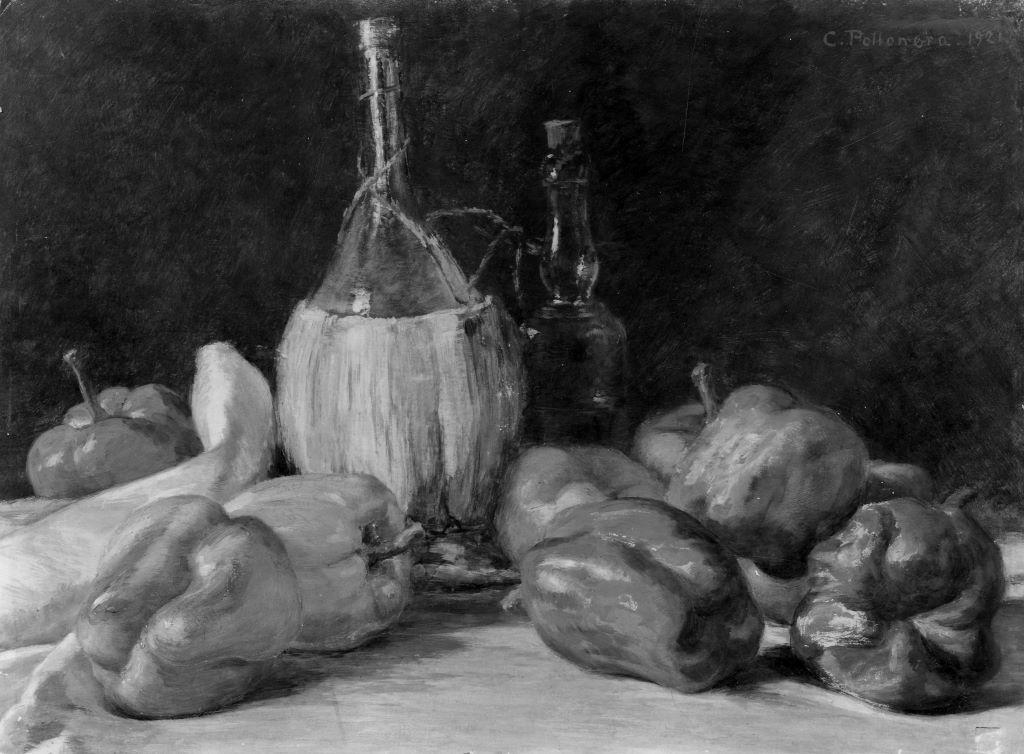
Peperoni con fiasco e bottiglia: Natura morta (Peppers with flask and bottle: still life), 1921

=== Examples of plates drawn by Pollonera illustrating his malacological papers ===
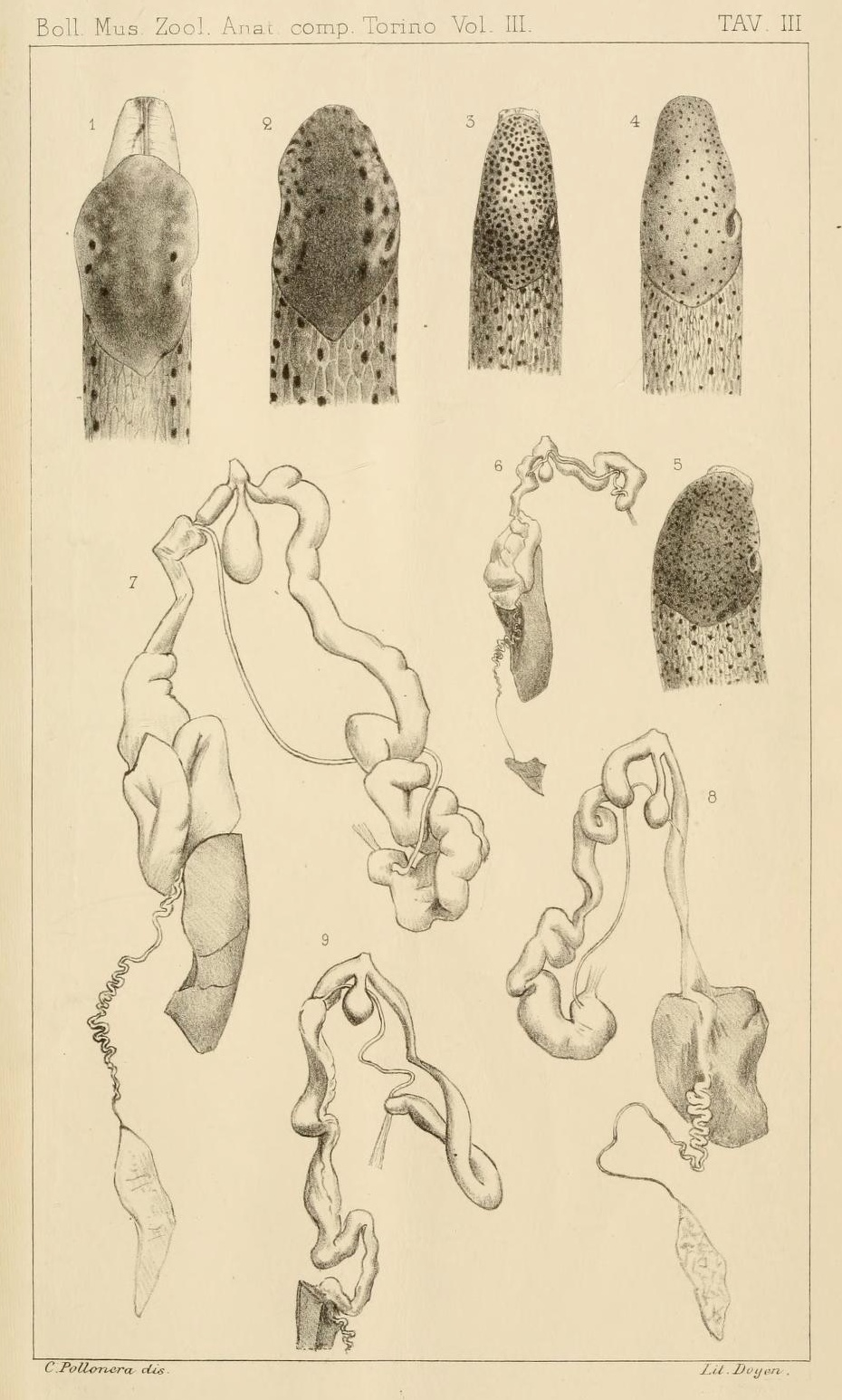
Italian Limax slugs with genitalia dissected out (1888)

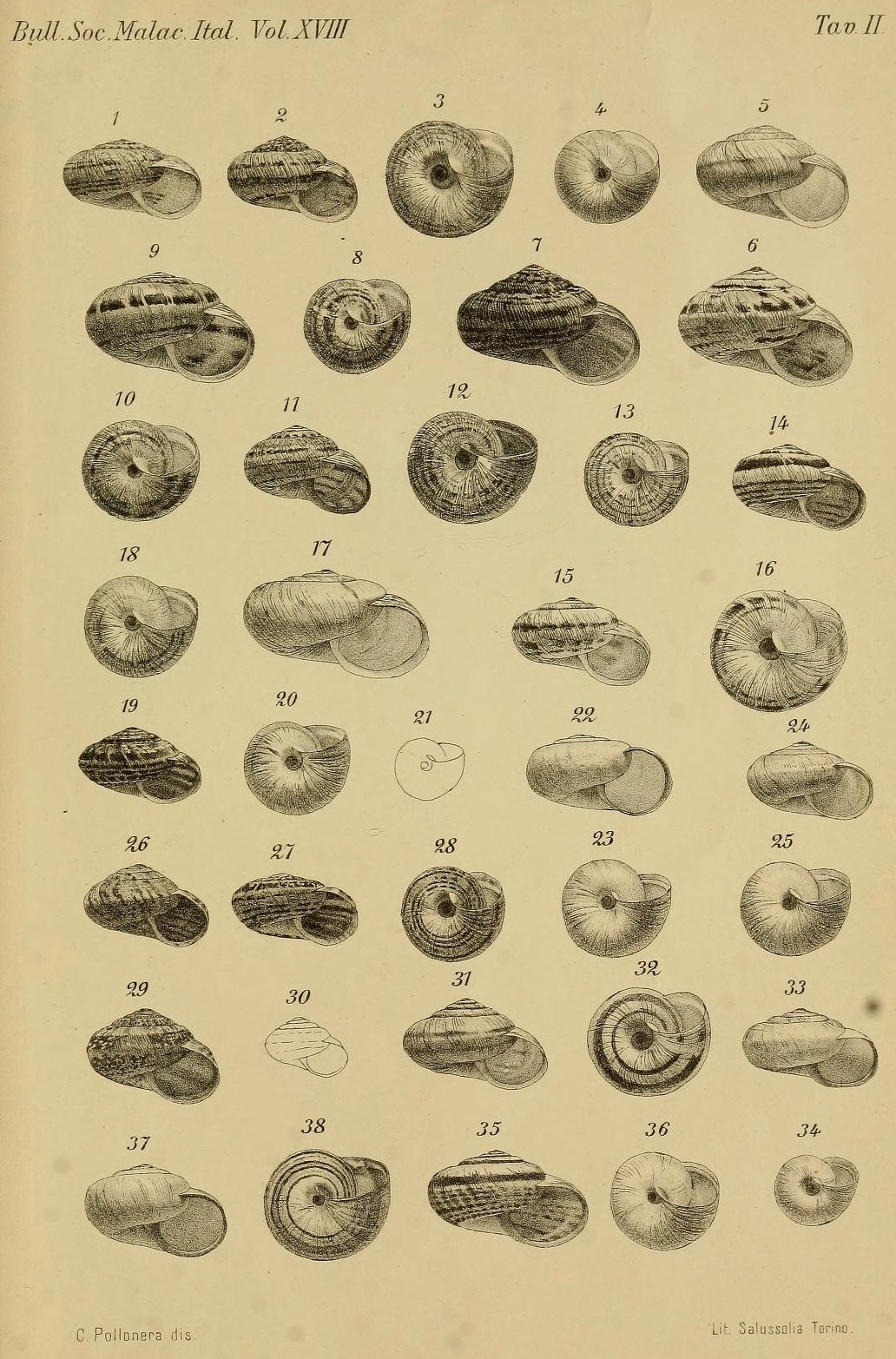
Xerophila shells (1892)
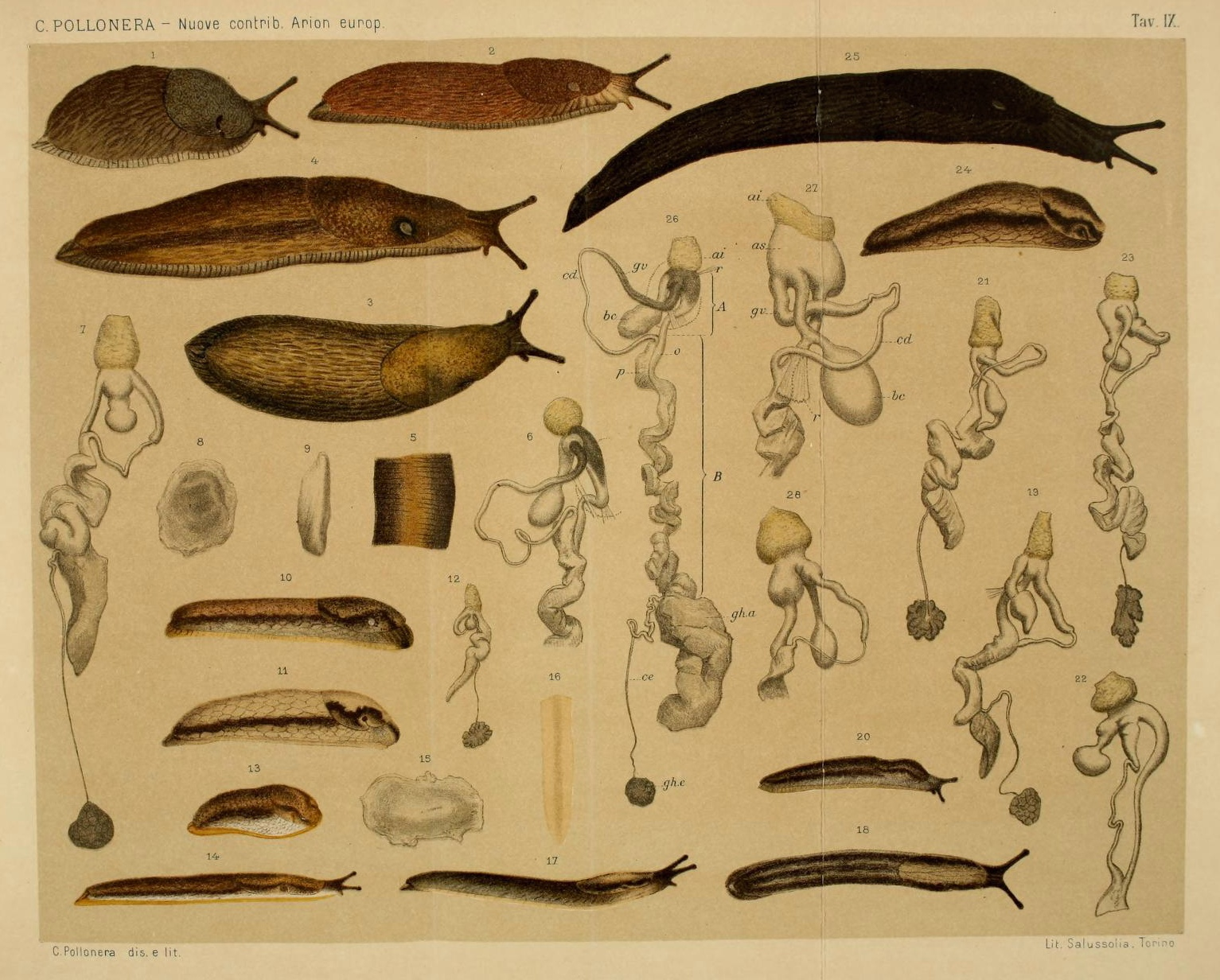
Arion slugs with genitalia dissected out (1889)
