= Trionfi (surname) =

Trionfi is an Italian surname. Notable people with the surname include:

- Alberto Trionfi, (1892–1945), Italian general during World War II
- Claudio Trionfi, (born 1942) Italian film and television actor
- Emanuele Trionfi (1832–1900), Italian painter and ceramist

== See also ==
- Trionfi (disambiguation)
