= Andrea Landini =

Italian painter

Andrea Landini (10 December 1847 – 1935) was an Italian painter.

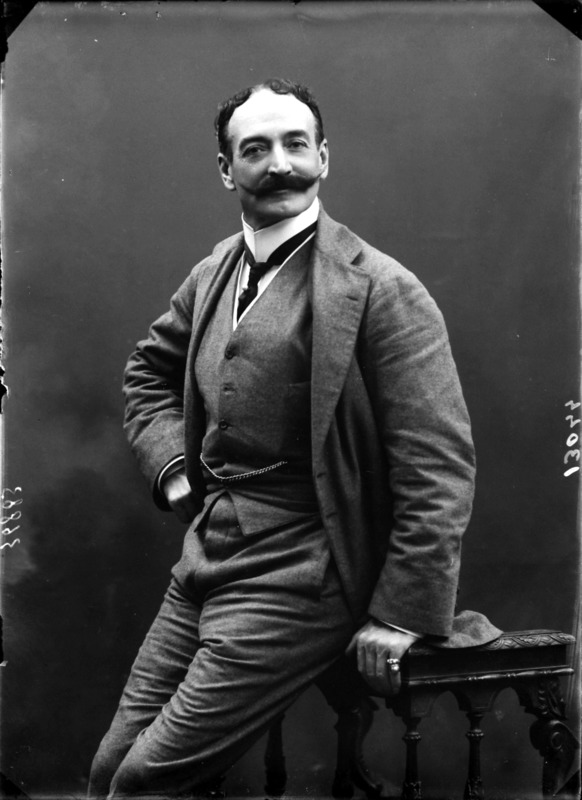
Andrea Landini

== Bibliography ==
He was born in Florence. He began his studies in design at Academy of Fine Arts of Florence under professor Riccardo Pasquini, and from there moved to the studio of professor Antonio Ciseri. He also painted and exhibited in Paris. He was mainly a portrait artist, but has also painted genre subjects. Among his main genre works are: The Seduction and The Return. Among his many portraits, many life size, are those of Signora Guerrazzi of Livorno; of contessa Lavinia Bocca; of Landini's sister; of the writer signora Elena Landini Ruffino; and finally a commissioned portrait of the Princess of Wales. Also notable is the portrait of the Countess di Pralormo, and the portrait of the boy of the contessa Laparelli Pitti. Landini also painted still-life paintings of flowers.

The British Museum has image of a number of paintings depicting individuals in period dress and in elegant interiors, typically a cardinal, indoors enjoying a meal or drink, and animated or contented with a conversation or game with his pet dog.

== Gallery ==
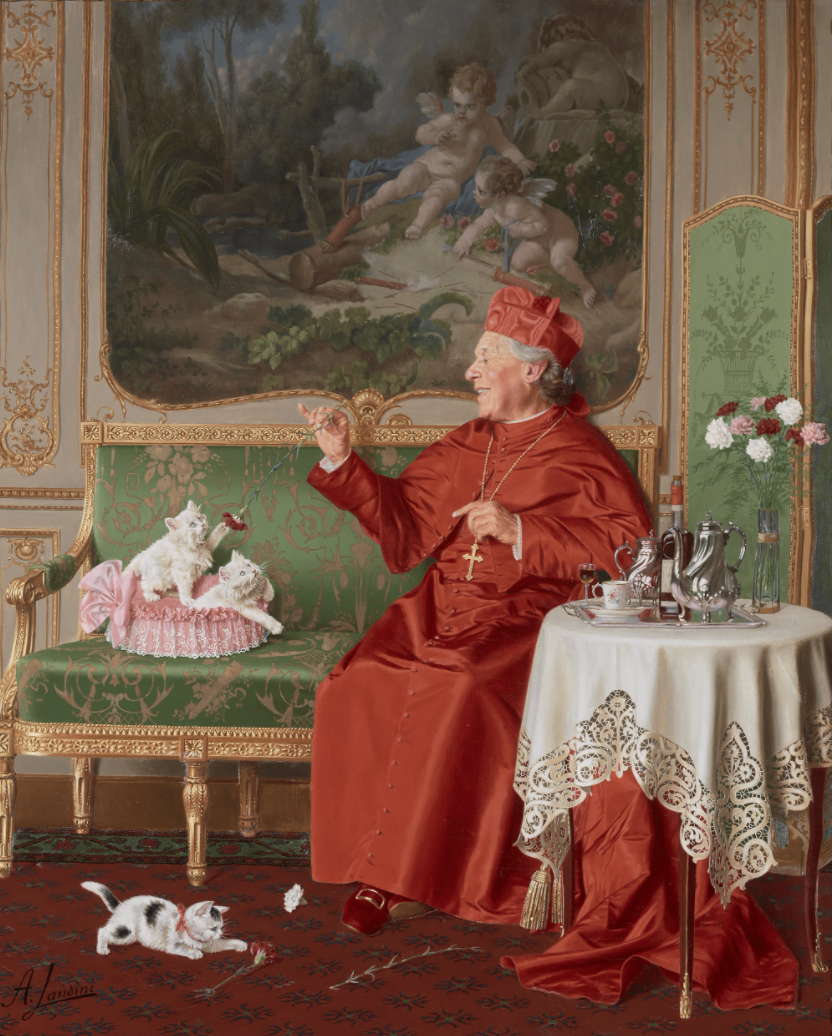
His Favorites, oil on canvas

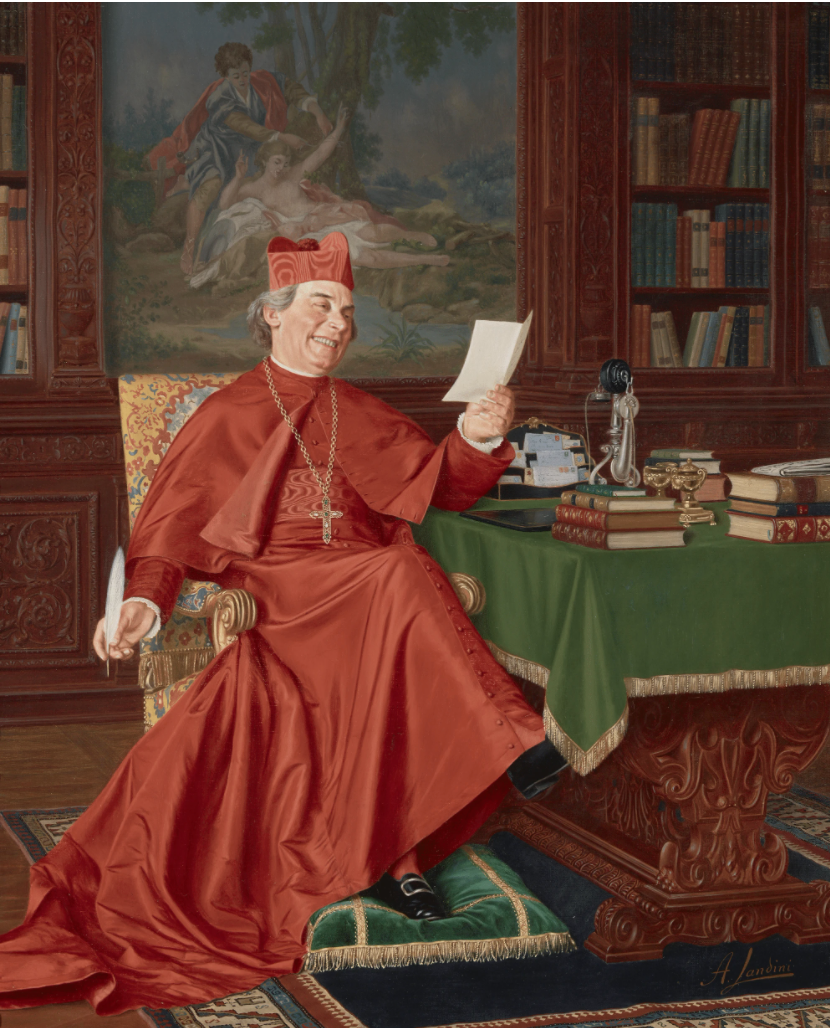
The Letter, oil on canvas

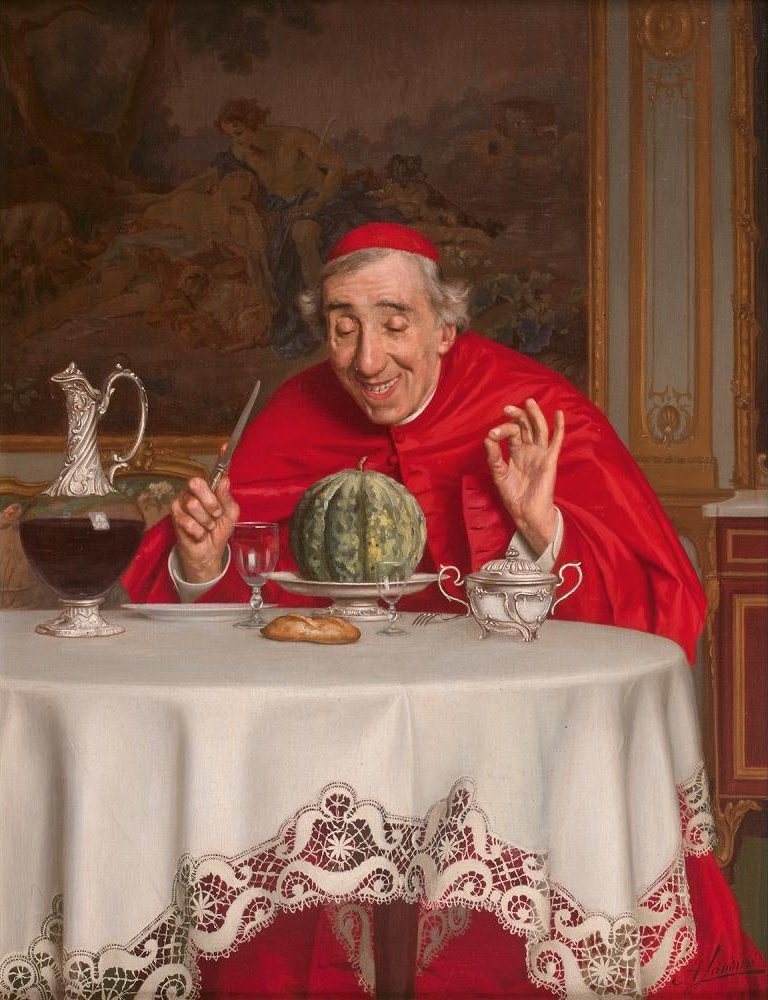
At Lunch, oil on canvas

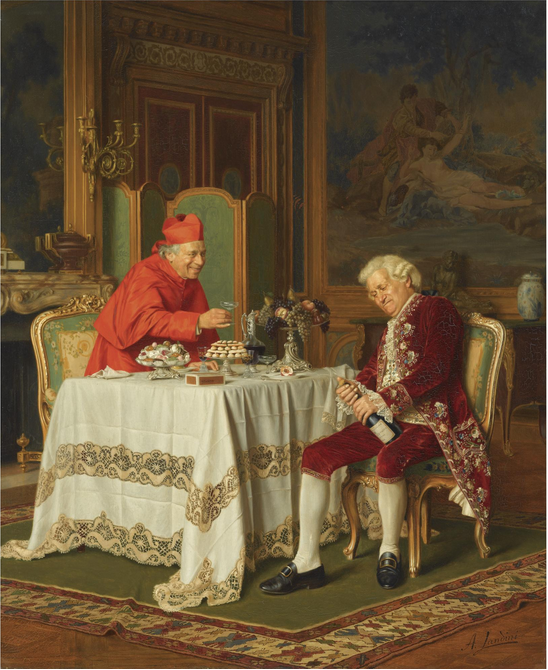
The Connoisseurs, oil on canvas
