= Giuseppe Carozzi =

Italian painter (1864–1938)

Giuseppe Carozzi (Milan, 1864 – Monaco, 1938) was an Italian painter.

== Biography ==
He first studied painting with Riccardo Pasquini in Turin, then studied medicine and law at Bologna, and finally returning to Milan and to painting, he frequented the studios of Leonardo Bazzaro and Filippo Carcano. His style of painting was influenced by Segantini and the writings of Vittore Grubicy on Divisionism. He initially painted genre scenes of the lagoon of Venice. His Vedute di Chioggia and I paesaggi montani won him the Fumagalli prize in 1897 at the Triennale di Milan. He had an individual exhibit at the 1912 Venice Biennale. His later work consisted mainly of alpine valley farms and fields.
