= Trichotoxon martensi =

Conservation status
- Data Deficient (IUCN 2.3)

Scientific classification
- Kingdom: Animalia
- Phylum: Mollusca
- Class: Gastropoda
- Order: Stylommatophora
- Family: Helicarionidae
- Genus: Trichotoxon
- Species: T. martensi

Binomial name
- Trichotoxon martensi Heynemann

Species of gastropod

Trichotoxon martensi is a species of air-breathing land snail or semislugs, a terrestrial pulmonate gastropod mollusc in the family Helicarionidae. This species is endemic to Tanzania.
