= Tacheocampylaea tacheoides =

Conservation status
- Endangered (IUCN 3.1)

Scientific classification
- Kingdom: Animalia
- Phylum: Mollusca
- Class: Gastropoda
- Order: Stylommatophora
- Family: Helicidae
- Genus: Tacheocampylaea
- Species: T. tacheoides

Binomial name
- Tacheocampylaea tacheoides (Pollonera, 1909)

Species of gastropod

Tacheocampylaea tacheoides is a species of air-breathing, land snail, a terrestrial pulmonate gastropod mollusc in the family Helicidae, the typical snails. This species is endemic to Italy. Its natural habitats are temperate forests and rocky areas.
