= Riccardo Pasquini =

Italian painter (1849–1937)

Riccardo Pasquini (Turin, 1849 - Belbey, France, 1937) was an Italian painter.

He attended the Accademia Albertina, and alongside Carlo Stratta, became a pupil of Antonio Fontanesi. He is described as an excellent painter of animals. He often painted small canvases. Along with Stratta and Carlo Pollonera, he traveled to Paris where he worked under Thomas Couture. At the 1870 Promotrice in Turin, he exhibited La Sera, un cantuccio della Stalla, and Il primo solco. At the 1871 Promotrice he displayed Schezzo dal vero, I SS martiri, Il passero di Lesbia, a first study of Lungo Dora, and December (Vanchiglia).

At the 1889 Turin Exposition, he displayed: Il lavoro pel bimbo; Prime affezioni; Vita rustica; and Primavera, lungo Dora. And at the 1884: Occupazioni invernali; La vera pace; L'ora di mangiare; Portrait d'uomo; Lontano dalla politica; and Casolare rustico. At the 1886 Milan Exposition, he sent Verso sera.

Stella lists his last entries in Exhibitions in 1889; his increased religiosity prompted him to become a priest, and function as a secretary to the Bishop of Novara, but still engaged in painting.
