= Bibliography of Carlo Pollonera =

This bibliography lists publications authored by the Italian malacologist and painter Carlo Pollonera (1849-1923). The article endeavours to be comprehensive, and includes all works listed in previous bibliographies of Pollonera. Zoological Record and AnimalBase have also been utilised. Works listed without an internet link have generally not been examined directly. Dates given here follow those printed on the individual issue wrappers (where these were available to inspect or where there were other reliable sources), which sometimes differ from those on the title page of the volume.

The last section considers some works to which Pollonera contributed without being an author; this part of the list is far more likely not to be comprehensive.

== Non-scientific publications ==
- Lessona, Marco (1886). Poesie. illustrated by Pollonera, C. Turin: Societa bibliofila.
- Pollonera, C.; Tavernier, A.; Balestrini, C. (1904). Società Promotrice di Belle Arti, Torino: Ricordo ai Soci dell'Esposizione 1904. Turin: Società Promotrice di Belle Arti.

== Scientific publications ==
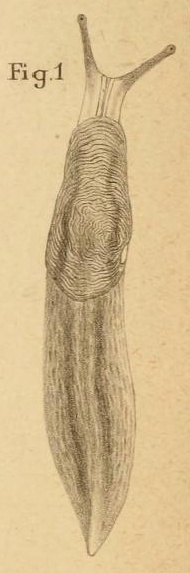
Illustration of Ambigolimax valentianus, drawn by Pollonera (1887)

- Lessona, M.; Pollonera, C. (1882). Monografia dei limacidi italiani. Turin: Loescher. pp. 1-82 + pls 1-3. [Reprinted as Lessona & Pollonera 1884.]
- Lessona, M.; Pollonera, C. (1884). "Monografia dei limacidi italiani". Memorie della Reale Accademia delle Scienze di Torino. Series 2. 35 (2): 49–128 + pls 1–3. [Reprint of Lessona & Pollonera 1882.]
- Pollonera, C. (1884). "Helix blanci Pollonera". Atti della Società italiana di scienze naturali. 27 (1): 78.
- Pollonera, C. (1884). "Monografia del genere Vitrina". Atti della Reale Accademia delle Scienze di Torino. 19 (3): 322–342 + pl. 10. [pp. 412–432 in some copies.]
- Pollonera, C. (1884). "Ueber einen Arion aus der Umgegund Bremens". Abhandlungen herausgegeben vom Naturwissenschaftlichen Verein zu Bremen. 9 (1): 59–63.
- Pollonera, C. (1885). "Note di malacologia piemontese: monografia della sezione Charpentieria del genere Clausilia". Atti della Reale Accademia delle Scienze di Torino. 20 (3): 325–342 + pl. 2. [pp. 409–426 in some copies.]
- Pollonera, C. (1885). "Elenco dei molluschi terrestri viventi in Piemonte". Atti della Reale Accademia delle Scienze di Torino. 20 (5): 517–545. [pp. 675–703 in some copies.]
- Pollonera, C. (1886). "Aggiunte alla malacologia terrestre del Piemonte". Bollettino dei Musei di Zoologia ed Anatomia Comparata della Reale Università di Torino. 1 (17): 1–4.
- Pollonera, C. (1887). "Appunti anatomici in appoggio ad una classificazione dei molluschi geofili del Piemonte". Bollettino della Società Malacologica Italiana. 12: 102–122 + pl. 4. [Listed as appearing in 1887 on authority of Guasco and others; the volume is dated 1886]
- Pollonera, C. (1887). "Note malacologiche". Bollettino della Società Malacologica Italiana. 12 (9–15): 204–223+ pl. 6. [Guasca and AnimalBase give publication date as 1887; the volume is dated 1886]

I. Molluschi della Valle del Natisone (Friuli)

II. Mongrafia degli Sphyradium italinani

III. Degli Odontocyclas italiani

- Pollonera, C. (1887). "Specie nuove o mal conosciute di Arion europei". Atti della Reale Accademia delle Scienze di Torino. 22 (5): 188–211 + pl. 3. [pp. 290–313 in some copies.]
- Pollonera, C. (1887). "Intorno ad alcuni Limacidi europei poco noti". Bollettino dei Musei di Zoologia ed Anatomia Comparata della Reale Università di Torino. 2 (21): 1–4 + pl. 1.
- Pollonera, C. (1887). "Sulla classificazione dei Limacidi del sistema europeo". Bollettino dei Musei di Zoologia ed Anatomia Comparata della Reale Università di Torino. 2 (23): 1–6 + pl. 3.
- Pollonera, C. (1887). "Nuove specie di molluschi dello Scioa". Bollettino dei Musei di Zoologia ed Anatomia Comparata della Reale Università di Torino. 2 (34): 1–2.
- Pollonera, C. (1888). "Nuove specie di molluschi terrestri raccolti nello Scioa dal Dottor V. Ragazzi". Bollettino dei Musei di Zoologia ed Anatomia Comparata della Reale Università di Torino. 3 (37): 1–4.
- Pollonera, C. (1888). "Appunti di malacologia". Bollettino dei Musei di Zoologia ed Anatomia Comparata della Reale Università di Torino. 3 (43): 1–10 + pl. 2.

I. Di alcume testacelle raccolte presso Torino

II Di alcume testacelle spagnole

III. Un nuovo limacide dell'Asia Minore

- Pollonera, C. (1888). "Appunti di malacologia. IV. Intorno ad alcuni Limax italiani". Bollettino dei Musei di Zoologia ed Anatomia Comparata della Reale Università di Torino. 3 (51): 1–4 + pl. 3.
- Pollonera, C. (1888). "Esame critico delle specie terrestri descritte come nuove dall'Abate G. Olivi". Bollettino della Società Malacologica Italiana. 13 (1–3): 9–16.
- Pollonera, C. (1888). "Molluschi dello Scioa e della Valle dell'Havash". Bollettino della Società Malacologica Italiana. 13 (4–7): 49–86 + pls 2–3.
- Pollonera, C. (1888). "Molluschi fossili post-Pliocenici del contorno di Torino". Memorie della Reale Accademia delle Scienze di Torino. Classe di Scienze Fisiche, Matematiche e Naturali. Series 2. 38 (4–7): 25–56 + 1 pl.
- Pollonera, C. (1889). "Nuove contribuzioni allo studio degli Arion europei". Atti della Reale Accademia delle Scienze di Torino. 24 (13): 401–418 + pl. 9. [pp. 623–640 in some copies.]
- Pollonera, C. (1889). "Osservazioni intorno ad alcune specie di Testacella". Bollettino dei Musei di Zoologia ed Anatomia Comparata della Reale Università di Torino. 4 (57): 1–6+ pl. 1. [For errata see Volume 5 Issue 79]
- Pollonera, C. (1889). "Nuove aggiunte e correzioni all macologia terrestre del Piemonte". Bollettino dei Musei di Zoologia ed Anatomia Comparata della Reale Università di Torino. 4 (58): 1–7. ["Macologia" really is written in the original title.]
- Pollonera, C. (1889). "Elenco dei molluschi fluviatili viventi in Piemonte". Bollettino dei Musei di Zoologia ed Anatomia Comparata della Reale Università di Torino. 4 (72): 1–16.

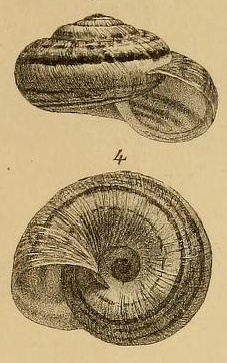
Illustration of Xerosecta cespitum drawn by Pollonera (1893)

- Pollonera, C. (1889). "Note malacologiche". Bollettino della Società Malacologica Italiana. 14 (4–6.5): 49–64+ pl. 2.

IV. Un nuovo Zospeum italiano

V. Acme italiane del gruppo delle costulatae

VI. Vitrina stabilei e V. maior

VII. La Xerophila submaritima Desmoul. in Italia

- Pollonera, C. (1889). "Subsidios para o estudo das especies portuguezas do genero Arion". O Instituto, Revista Scientifica e Litteraria. Series 2. 37 (4): 238–240.
- Pollonera, C. (1890). "Intorno a due Limacidi dell'Algeria". Bollettino dei Musei di Zoologia ed Anatomia Comparata della Reale Università di Torino. 5 (74): 1–4.
- Pollonera, C. (1890). "Apunti di malacologia". Bollettino dei Musei di Zoologia ed Anatomia Comparata della Reale Università di Torino. 5 (75): 1–4.

V. Un limacide nuovo per l'Italia

VI. Una nuova stazione del Limax corsicus

- Pollonera, C. (1890). "Sulla Testacella maugei di Francia". Bollettino dei Musei di Zoologia ed Anatomia Comparata della Reale Università di Torino. 5 (79): 1–2.
- Pollonera, C. (1890). "A proposito degli Arion del Portogallo. Risposta as Dr Simroth". Bollettino dei Musei di Zoologia ed Anatomia Comparata della Reale Università di Torino. 5 (80): 1–7.
- Pollonera, C. (1890). "Recensement des Arionidae de la région paléarctique". Bollettino dei Musei di Zoologia ed Anatomia Comparata della Reale Università di Torino. 5 (87): 1–42.
- Pollonera, C. (1890). "Sulle forme del gruppo della Campylaea cingulata Studer". Bollettino della Società Malacologica Italiana. 15 (4–5): 49–75 + pls 1–3.
- Pollonera, C. (1891). "Appunti di malacologia. VII. Intorno ai Limacidi di Malta". Bollettino dei Musei di Zoologia ed Anatomia Comparata della Reale Università di Torino. 6 (99): 1–4.
- Pollonera, C. (1891). "Appunti di malacologia. VIII. Sui Limacidi dell'Algeria". Bollettino dei Musei di Zoologia ed Anatomia Comparata della Reale Università di Torino. 6 (100): 1–5. [See comment on 1893 article with similar title.]
- Pollonera, C. (1892). "Note su alcuni grupi di specie del genere Xerophila. Sul grupo della X. subprofuga". Bollettino dei Musei di Zoologia ed Anatomia Comparata della Reale Università di Torino. 7 (128): 1–18.
- Pollonera, C. (1893). "Studi sulle Xerophila. I. Le X. cespitum e Terveri e forme intermedie". Bollettino della Società Malacologica Italiana. 18 (1–3): 7–46+ pls 1–2.
- Pollonera, C. (1893). "Sui Limacidi dell'Algeria". Medit. Natural. 3: 422–425.[Both Zoological Record and earlier bibliographies list this article, but it has not proved possible to trace the journal. Zoological Record states that it describes the same new species as does Pollonera's article with the same title from 1891, so it may be a reprinted version.]
- Pollonera, C. (1896). "Appunti di malacologia. IX-X". Bollettino dei Musei di Zoologia ed Anatomia Comparata della Reale Università di Torino. 11 (264): 1–6.

IX. Sui limacidi della Corsica

X. Un nuovo limacide della Toscana. Agriolimax Cecconii, n. sp.

- Pollonera, C. (1898). "Molluschi terrestri e fluviatili dell'Eritrea raccolti dal Generale Di Boccard". Bollettino dei Musei di Zoologia ed Anatomia Comparata della Reale Università di Torino. 13 (313): 1–13 + 1 pl.
- Pollonera, C. (1898). "Intorno al alcune conchiglie del Friuli". Bollettino dei Musei di Zoologia ed Anatomia Comparata della Reale Università di Torino. 13 (334): 1–4.
- Pollonera, C. (1899). "Un metodo per raccogliere i molluschi cavernicoli". In Alto, Cronaca della Società Alpina Friulana. 10: 67.
- Pollonera, C. (1901). "Spedizione polare di S. A. R. Luigi di Savoia Duca degli Abruzzi. Diagnosi preventive di alcune specie nuove di molluschi". Bollettino dei Musei di Zoologia ed Anatomia Comparata della Reale Università di Torino. 16 (392): 1.
- Pollonera, C. (1903). "Molluschi: osservazioni". In Luigi Amedeo di Savoia, Duca degli Abruzzi (ed.). Osservazioni Scientifiche Eseguite Durante la Spedizione Polare di S. A. R. Luigi Amedeo di Savoia Duca degli Abruzzi, 1899-1900. Milan: U. Hoepli. pp. 621–623.

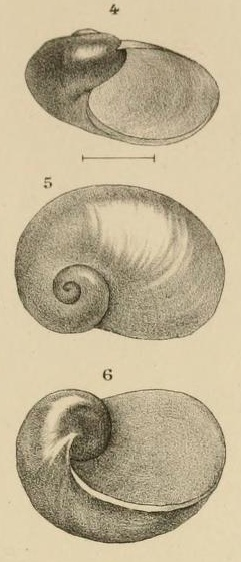
Illustration of Vitrina demissa drawn by Pollonera (1898)

- Pollonera, C. (1905). "Note malacologiche". Bollettino dei Musei di Zoologia ed Anatomia Comparata della Reale Università di Torino. 20 (517): 1–10 + 1 pl.

I. Intorno a due nuove specie di Acameidae

II. Molluschi terrestri e fluviatili delle Isole d'Elba e Pianosa

III. Sulla Cochlicella contermina Shuttleworth

- Pollonera, C. (1905). "I Zospeum italiani". Proteus, Rivista Internazionale Bimensile di Biologia Sotterranea. 3 (1): 2–4.
- Pollonera, C. (1906). "Ein neues italienisches Zospeum". Nachrichtsblatt der Deutschen Malakozoologischen Gesellschaft. 38 (1): 16.
- Pollonera, C. (1906). "Spedizione al Ruwenzoi di S. A. R. Luigi Amedeo di Savoia Duca degli Abruzzi. II. Nuove specie di Molluschi terrestri (diagnosi preventive)". Bollettino dei Musei di Zoologia ed Anatomia Comparata della Reale Università di Torino. 21 (538): 1–4.
- Pollonera, C. (1906). "Spedizione al Ruwenzoi di S. A. R. Luigi Amedeo di Savoia Duca degli Abruzzi. VII. Vaginulidae e Urocyclidae (diagnosi preventive)". Bollettino dei Musei di Zoologia ed Anatomia Comparata della Reale Università di Torino. 21 (543): 1–6.
- Pollonera, C. (1907). "Spedizione al Ruwenzoi di S. A. R. Luigi Amedeo di Savoia Duca degli Abruzzi. XX. Nuove specie di Molluschi (diagnosi preventive)". Bollettino dei Musei di Zoologia ed Anatomia Comparata della Reale Università di Torino. 22 (561): 1–3.
- Pollonera, C. (1907). "Spedizione al Ruwenzoi di S. A. R. Luigi Amedeo di Savoia Duca degli Abruzzi. XXII. Nuova specie di Molluschi (diagnosi preventive)". Bollettino dei Musei di Zoologia ed Anatomia Comparata della Reale Università di Torino. 22 (564): 1.
- Pollonera, C. (1907). "Spedizione al Ruwenzoi di S. A. R. Luigi Amedeo di Savoia Duca degli Abruzzi. XXV. Nuova specie di Molluschi (diagnosi preventive)". Bollettino dei Musei di Zoologia ed Anatomia Comparata della Reale Università di Torino. 22 (568): 1–2.
- Pollonera, C. (1909). "Note malacologiche". Bollettino dei Musei di Zoologia ed Anatomia Comparata della Reale Università di Torino. 24 (608): 1–19 + 1 pl.

IV. Sui Limacidi della Siria e della Palestina

V. Sull'Agriolimax panormintanus

Sul genere Oopelta

VII. Due forme misconosciute di Zonites italiani

VIII. Una nuova Tacheocampylaea dell'Isola di Capraia

- Pollonera, C. (1909). "Molluschi, Stylommatophora". In S.A.R. il Principe Luigi Amedeo di Savoia Duca Degli Abruzzi (ed.). Il Ruwenzori. Parte scientifica. Risultati delle Osservazioni e Studi Compiuti sul Materiale Raccolto dalla Spedizione. Vol. 1. Milan: U. Hoepli. pp. 181–206 + 5 pl.
- Pollonera, C. (1911). "New species of Urocyclidae from British East Africa". Annals and Magazine of Natural History. Series 8. 8 (45): 331–334 + pl. 8. doi:10.1080/00222931108693035.
- Pollonera, C. (1916). "Liste des limaciens prevenant des récoltes de M. Pallary dans le grand Atlas". Bulletin du Muséum National d'Histoire Naturelle. 22 (4): 191–192. [The second half of the paper is an additional note written by Pallary.]
- Pollonera, C. (1916). "Escursioni zoologiche del Dott. Enrico Festa nell'Isola di Rodi. XIII. Molluschi". Bollettino dei Musei di Zoologia ed Anatomia Comparata della Reale Università di Torino. 31 (716): 1–9.

== Additional works ==
Pollonera is given as the authority of some species descriptions in the following two publications by Caziot. Although this implies that he wrote most of the description, according to the current ICZN code the authority should nevertheless be considered as Caziot alone.

- Caziot, E. (1903). "Étude sur la faune des mollusques vivants terrestres et fluviatiles de l'Île de Corse". Bulletin de la Société des sciences historiques et naturelles de la Corse. 22 (266–269): 1-354 + pl. 1-2. [See p. 120.]
- Caziot, E. (1908). "Compte rendu d'une excursion malacologique dan la partie supérieure de la Vallée de la Roya, et dans le voisinage de la mer, sur la rive droite du Var, près Nice". Mémoires de la Société Zoologique de France. 20 (3): 435–469.

Pollonera also sometimes drew the plates for the publications of colleagues. Listed below are two examples, but there are liable to be others.

- Pini, N. (1885). "Note malacologiche sulla fauna Italiana". Atti della Società Italiana di Scienze Naturali. 27: 79–86.
- Fra Piero [=Arbanasich, P.] (1897). "Nota sui limacidi in Sardegna a proposito di una nuova specie di Vitrina". Annuario del Club Alpino Sardo. 4: 65–75 + pl.

Pollonera was a successful painter, so his paintings have appeared in various books and articles. The following are celebrations of this aspect of his work that include illustrations. The last of these (Picco, 1998) includes in his listing of 305 of Pollonera's paintings instances of where each work has been reproduced or exhibited.

- Bosio, P. (1924). "Carlo Pollonera: pittore di montagna". La Rivista della Giovane Montagna. 10 (issues 6, 7, 8) pp. 127-129, 155–158, 185-187 + plates following pp. 124 and 172.
- Guasco, R. (1974). Carlo Pollonera. Città di Torino - Assessorato alla Cultura. Foyer del Teatro Regio - 16 gennaio - 16 febbraio 1974. Turin: Stabilimento Grafico Impronta.
- Picco, A. (1998). Carlo Pollonera. Turin: Umberto Allemandi. ISBN 88-422-0846-9.
