= Trionfi =

Trionfi may refer to:

- Plural of trionfo, Italian triumphal procession
- Trionfi (cards), 15th-century playing cards which in French are called "tarot cards"
- Trionfi (Carl Orff), a trilogy of cantatas
- "Trionfi" (poem), 14th-century poem by Petrarch
- Trionfi (surname), Italian surname
