= Oreste Costa =

Italian painter (1851–1901)

Oreste Costa (1851–1901) was an Italian painter, active mainly painting genre scenes, landscapes, and still lifes.

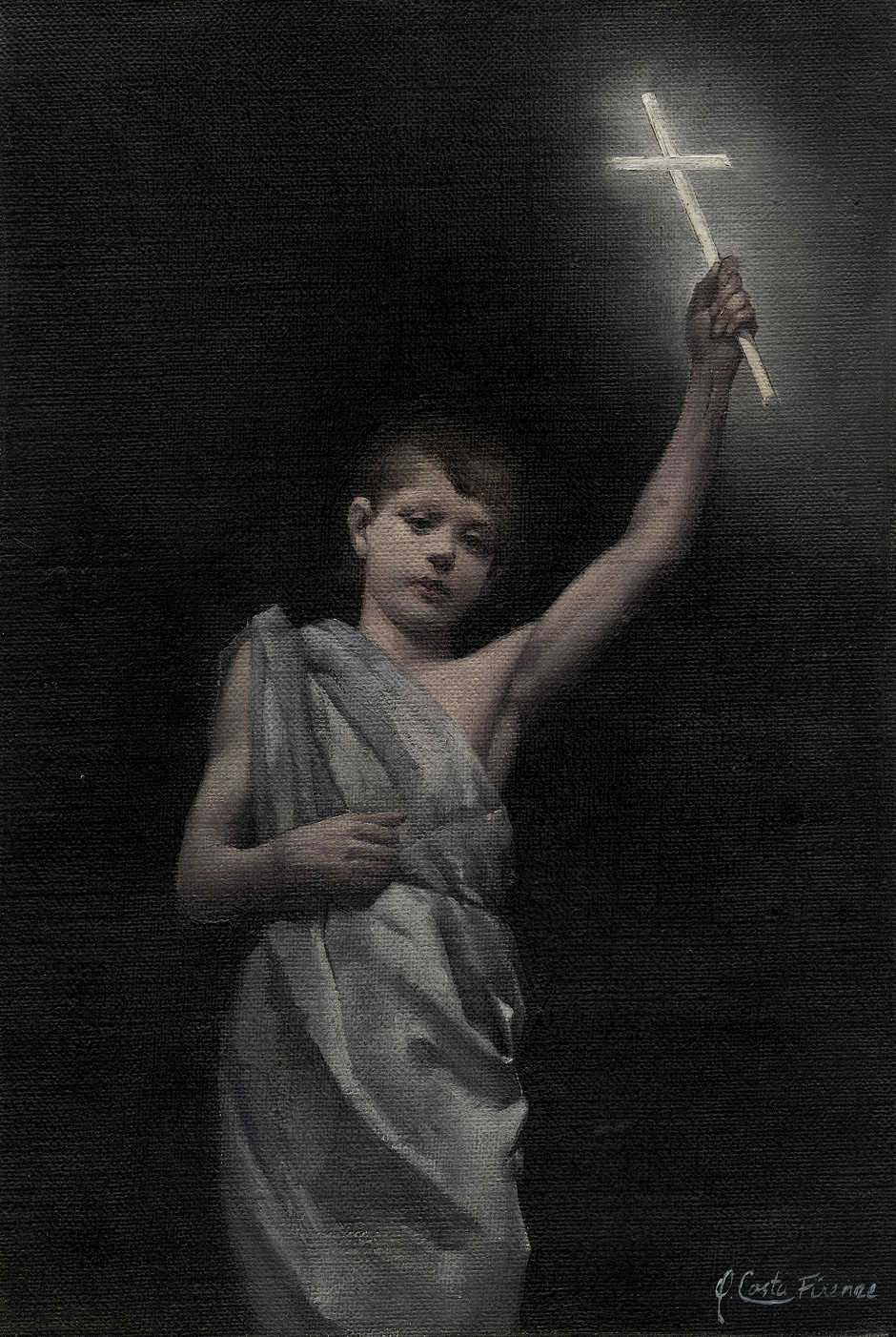
Young John the Baptist

== Biography ==
He was born in Florence, Grand Duchy of Tuscany, and trained under Antonio Ciseri. Among his works was a Gli ultimi Sforzi. His brother Antonio was also a painter. He exhibited frequently in England. One of his paintings, a genre scene with tippling elderly peasants is found at the Hillwood museum.
