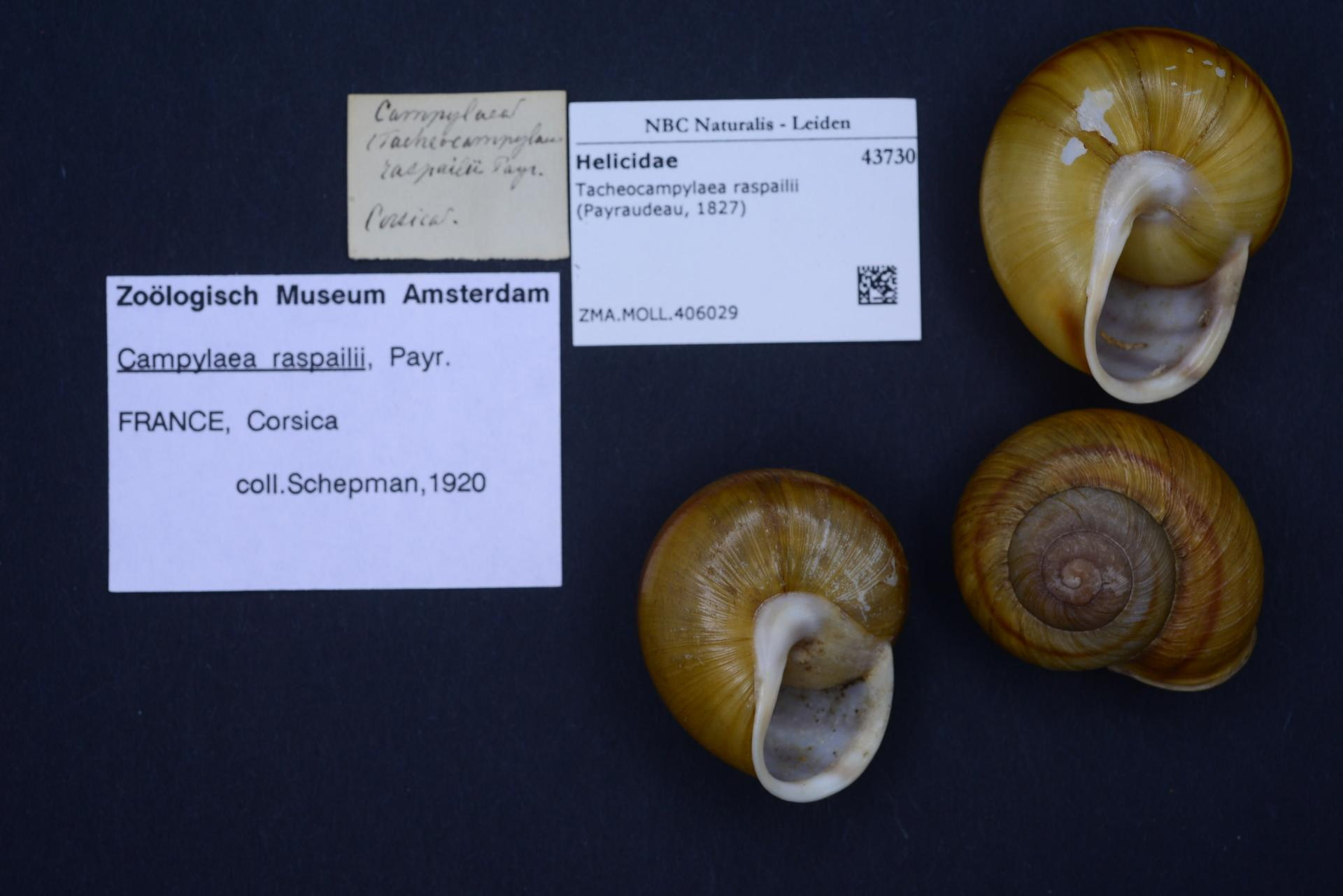
- Tacheocampylaea raspailii shells

Conservation status
- Vulnerable (IUCN 3.1)

Scientific classification
- Kingdom: Animalia
- Phylum: Mollusca
- Class: Gastropoda
- Order: Stylommatophora
- Family: Helicidae
- Genus: Tacheocampylaea
- Species: T. raspailii

Binomial name
- Tacheocampylaea raspailii (Payraudeau, 1826)

Synonyms
- Tacheocampylaea raspaili (Payraudeau, 1826)

= Tacheocampylaea raspailii =

Species of gastropod

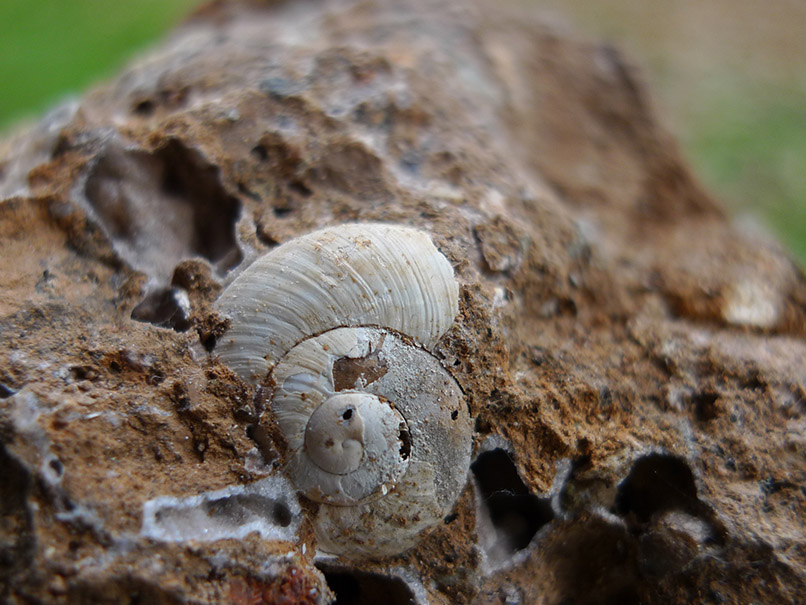
Tacheocampylaea raspailii, pleistocene fossil near Bastia, Corsica.

Tacheocampylaea raspailii is a species of air-breathing land snail, a terrestrial pulmonate gastropod mollusk in the family Helicidae. This species is endemic to Corsica, France.

This name has been sometimes used, incorrectly, in the scientific literature to refer to any of the 27 names that have been given to species of Corsican molluscs in the genus Tacheocampylaea.
