= Alcide Segoni =

Italian painter (1847–1894)

Alcide Segoni (April 1847 – 1894) was an Italian painter.

He was born in Florence, Grand Duchy of Tuscany, and began his studies at the Academy of Fine Arts of Florence under the direction of professor Antonio Ciseri. His first canvas was the Recovery of the body of Catiline, following the battle near Pistoia, awarded gold medal at the Triennial contest of 1871, and later displayed in the Modern Gallery in Florence. In 1874, he completed a large canvas of Death of Filippo Strozzi, afterwards he painted a Michelangelo and Vittoria Colonna; Il Maresciallo d'Anere at the Court of the Regent Queen Maria; and Napoleon I awards a dragoon the Legion of Honor. Other works, among them include a Dopo la vincita, exhibited in Turin in 1880. L'agguato was exhibited at the 1881 Exhibition of Fine Arts in Milan, along with an oil canvas of Un Ratto, and another painting depicting a costume of the 18th century. At the 1877 National Artistic Exposition in Venice he exhibited a canvas titled Antiquarian. Other paintings of note are: The Curious; How will it end?; The vindicated Honor; An Interrogation; The interrupted confession; Questo non si tocca; The interrogation; Dichiarazione, in cantina; La storia d'un moschettiere; Una partita a scacchi; L'ordine per il campo; Presentazione della sposa allo zio cardinale.
