= Antonio Costa (painter) =

Italian painter (1847-1915)

Antonio Costa (1847–1915) was an Italian painter.

== Biography ==
He was born in Florence, brother of Oreste Costa, also a painter, and like him trained under Antonio Ciseri in the Academy of Fine Arts of Florence. His son Emanuele was a member of the Macchiaioli movement of painters. Antonio Costa is also the name of an 18th-century ecclesiastical scholar born in Piacenza.
