= Antonio Ciseri =

Swiss-Italian painter (1821–1891)

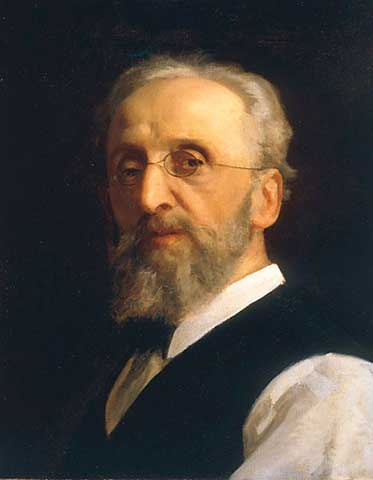
- Self-portrait of Antonio Ciseri painted in 1888
- Born: 25 October 1821; Ronco sopra Ascona, Switzerland
- Died: 8 March 1891 (aged 69); Florence, Italy
- Education: Ernesto Bonaiuti, Niccola Benvenuti, Pietro Benvenuti, Giuseppe Bezzuoli
- Known for: Painting
- Notable work: Ecce Homo (1871); The Transport of Christ to the Sepulcher (1864–1870)

Antonio Ciseri (25 October 1821 – 8 March 1891) was a Swiss-Italian painter of religious subjects. Ciseri's paintings are Raphaelesque in their compositional outlines and their polished surfaces, but are nearly photographic in effect. Among his pupils were the painters Oreste Costa, Giuseppe Guzzardi, Alcide Segoni, Andrea Landini, Raffaello Sorbi, Niccolò Cannicci, Emanuele Trionfi, Juan Manuel Blanes and Girolamo Nerli.

== Biography ==
He was born in Ronco sopra Ascona, Switzerland. He went to Florence in 1833 to study drawing with Ernesto Bonaiuti. Within a year, by 1834 he was a pupil of Niccola and Pietro Benvenuti at the Accademia di Belle Arti in Florence; he was later taught by Giuseppe Bezzuoli, who greatly influenced the early part of his career. In 1849, he began offering instruction to young painters, and eventually ran a private art school. Among his earliest students was Silvestro Lega. In these years Ciseri fulfilled many important commissions from churches in Italy and Switzerland.

Ciseri's early works were influenced by the Swiss Academic painter Charles Gleyre. Between 1860 and 1870 his style became less emotional and more objective: the drawing is clearer and more precise and the colours are brighter in such paintings as Render unto Caesar that which is Caesar’s (1860–62; Locarno, Madonna del Sasso), St. Martin (1860–69; Ronco, parish church) and Bearing the Body of Christ to the Sepulchre (1864–70; Locarno, Madonna del Sasso).

In 1868 Ciseri was elected a member of the Consiglio Superiore della Pubblica Istruzione, in which capacity he often went to Rome; during these visits he met important political and cultural figures, and often painted their portraits. Ciseri devoted himself to portrait painting during the last 20 years of his life. Among the most important later works are the portraits of Emilio Santarelli (Florence, Palazzo Pitti), Gino Capponi (Florence, Palazzo Pitti), King Umberto I of Italy and Queen Margherita of Savoy.

Ecce homo (completed 1891; Florence, Palazzo Pitti), which was commissioned in 1871 by the Italian government, is the most impressive of his religious works. It was exhibited in his studio immediately after his death and won over even those critics who had not previously admired his painting; its luminosity is akin to that of Cesare Maccari and Domenico Morelli. He died in Florence on 8 March 1891.

== Gallery ==
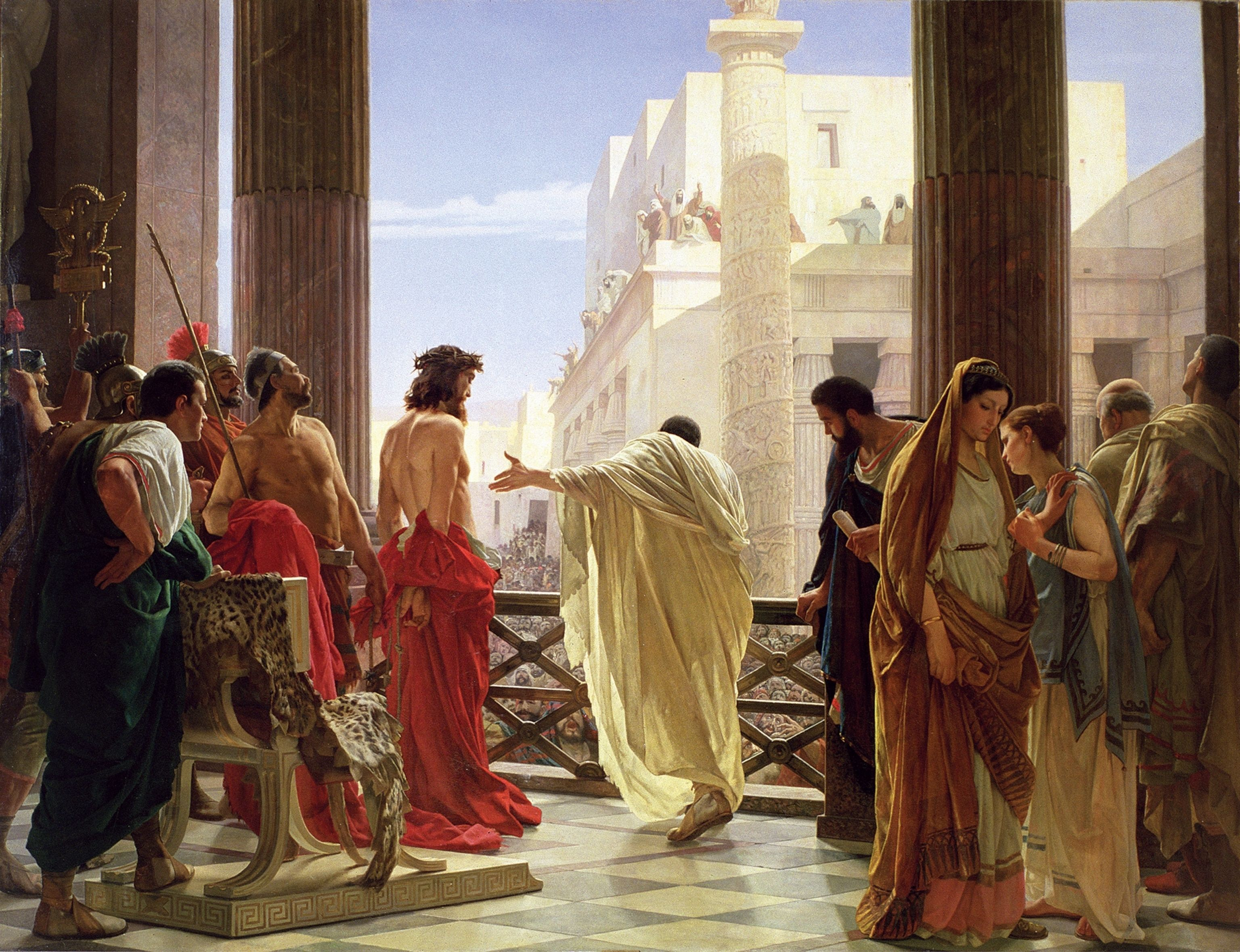
Ecce Homo, 1871

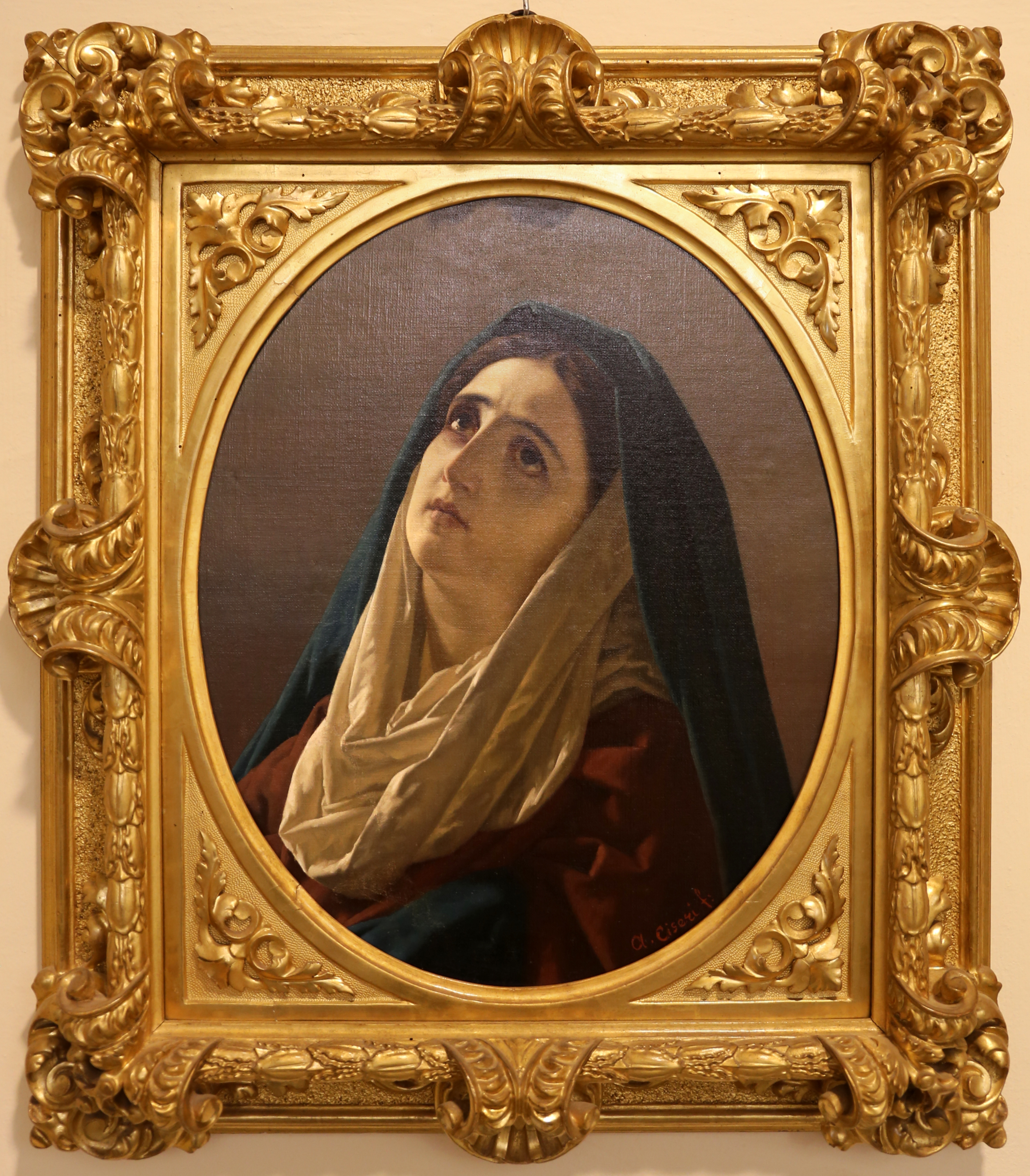
Sorrowful Madonna

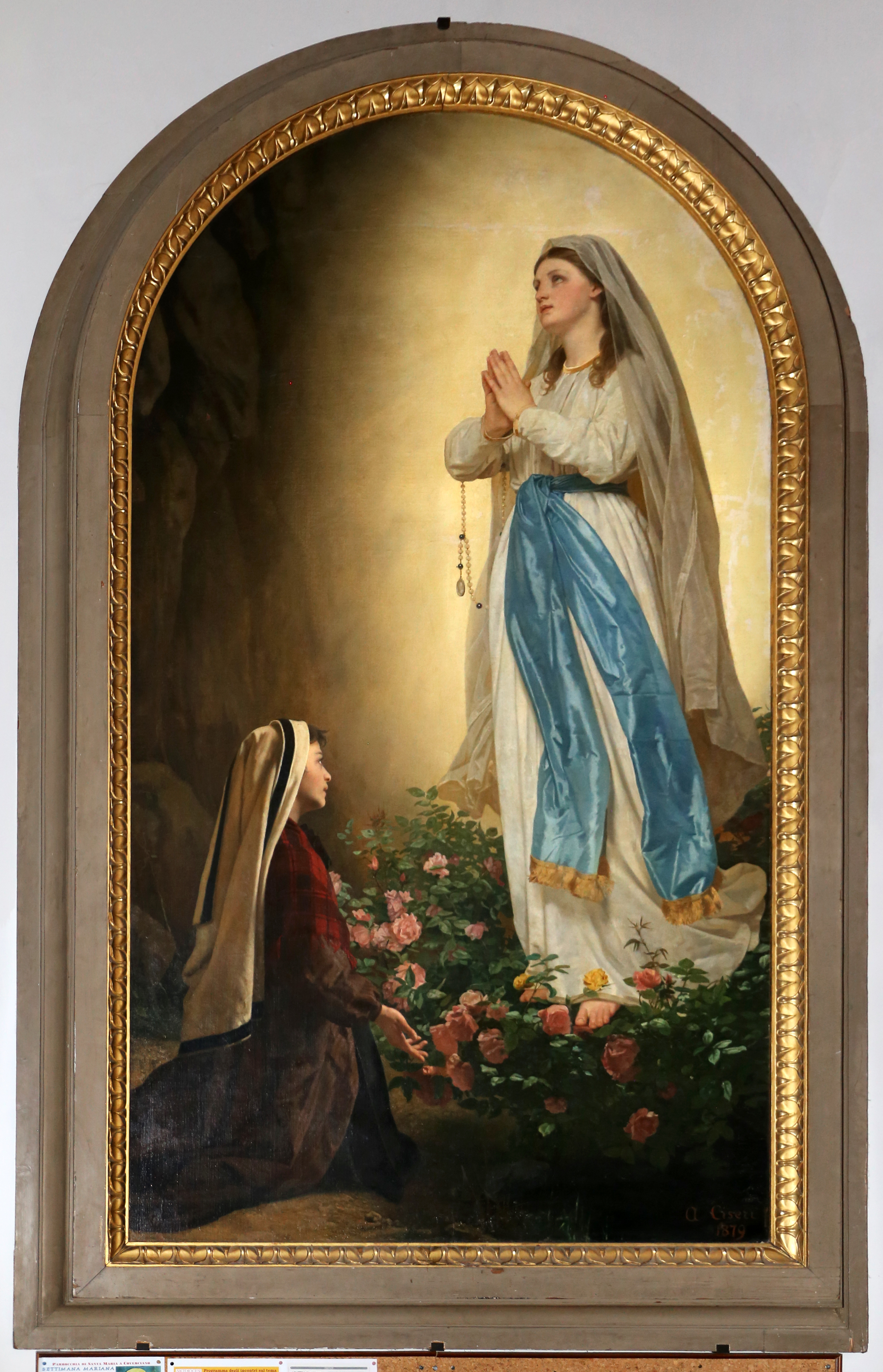
Apparition of Our Lady of Lourdes to Bernadette, 1879

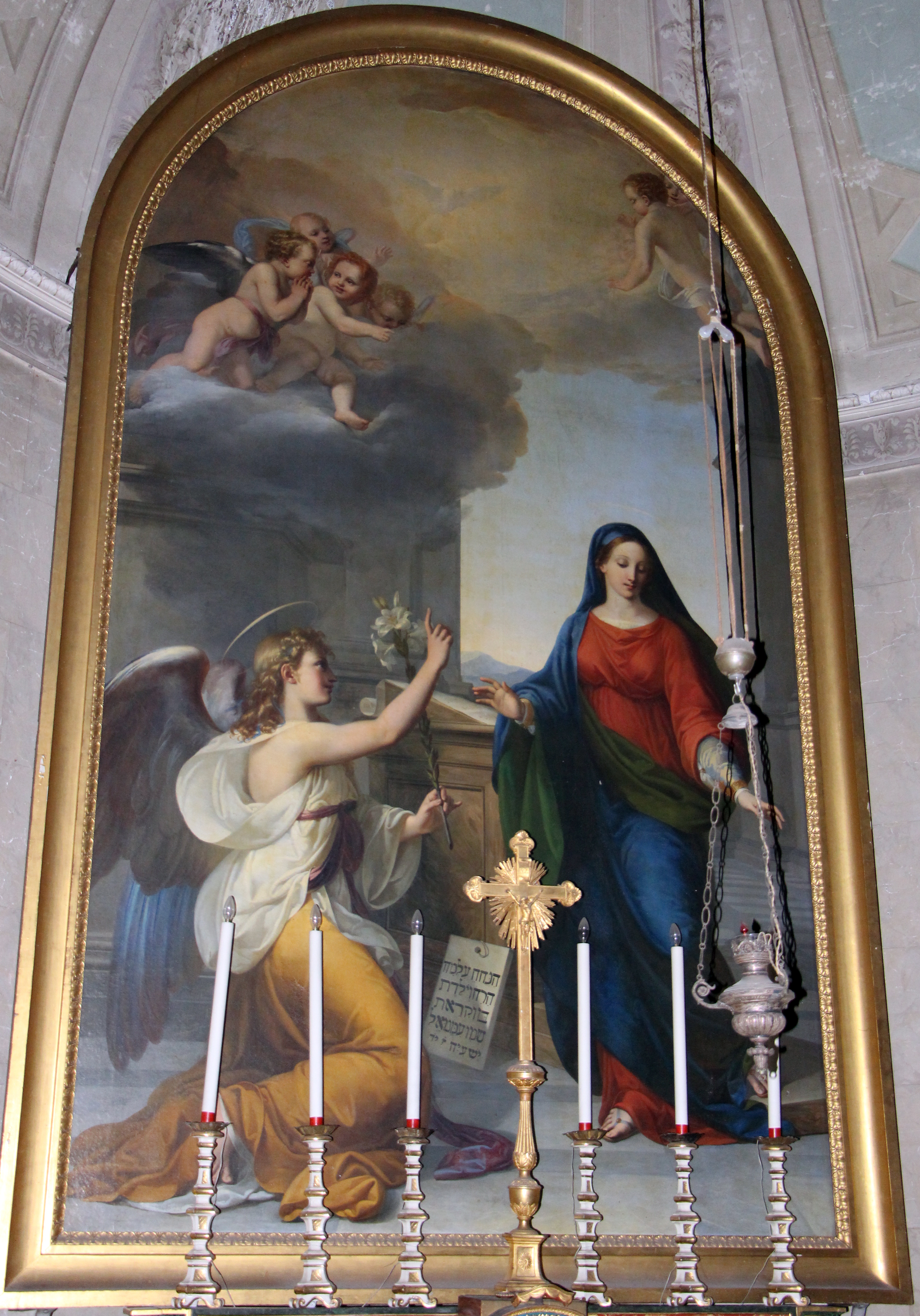
The Annunciation of Mary, 1891

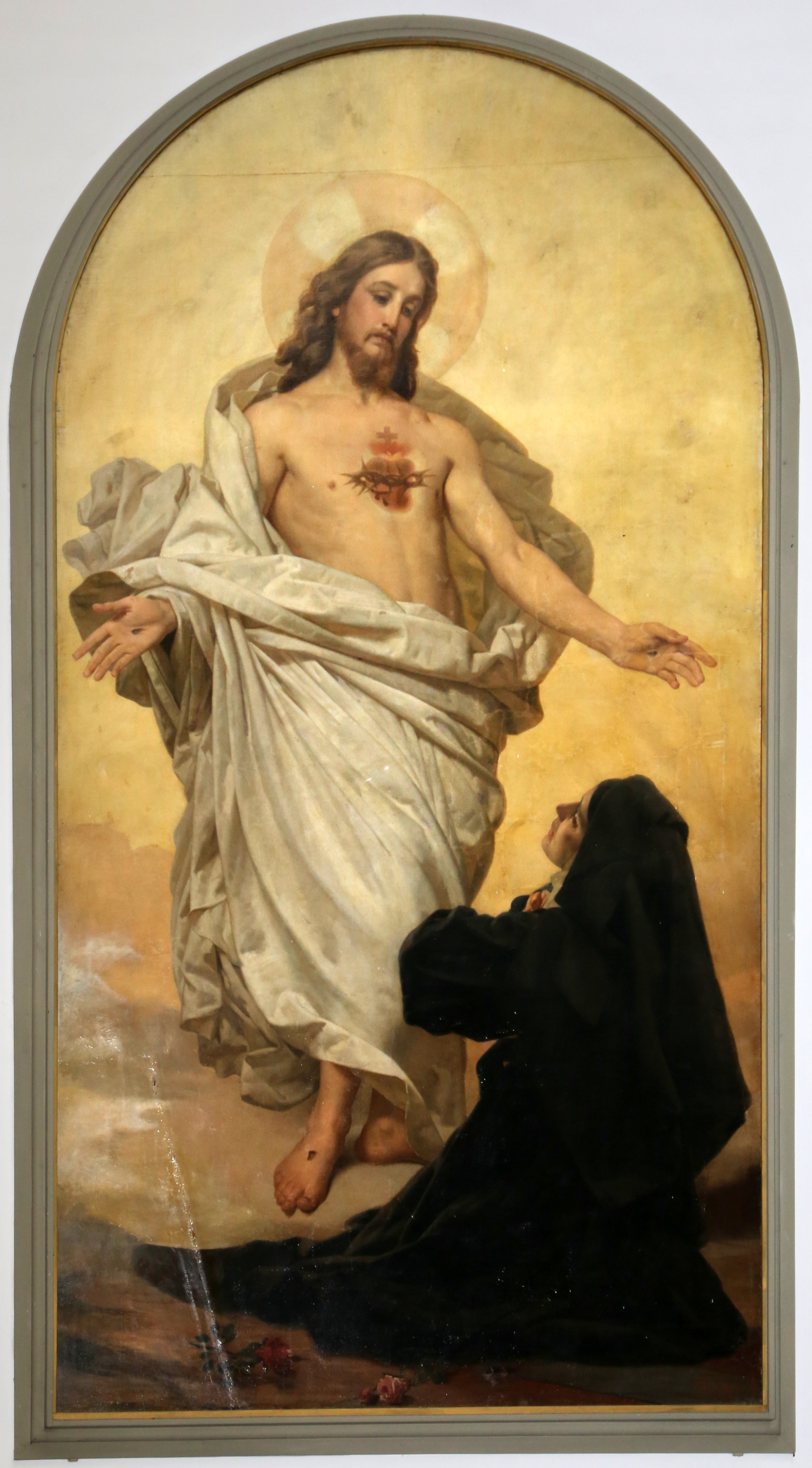
Apparition of the Sacred Heart to Saint Mary Alacoque

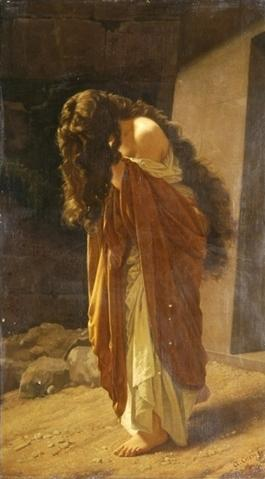
Penitent Magdalene, 1864

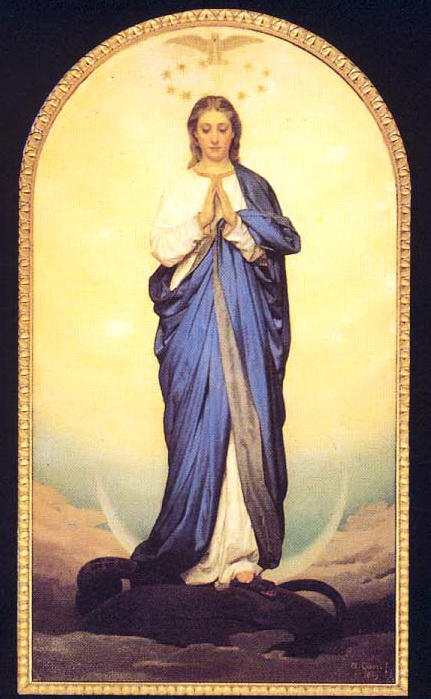
The Immaculate Conception

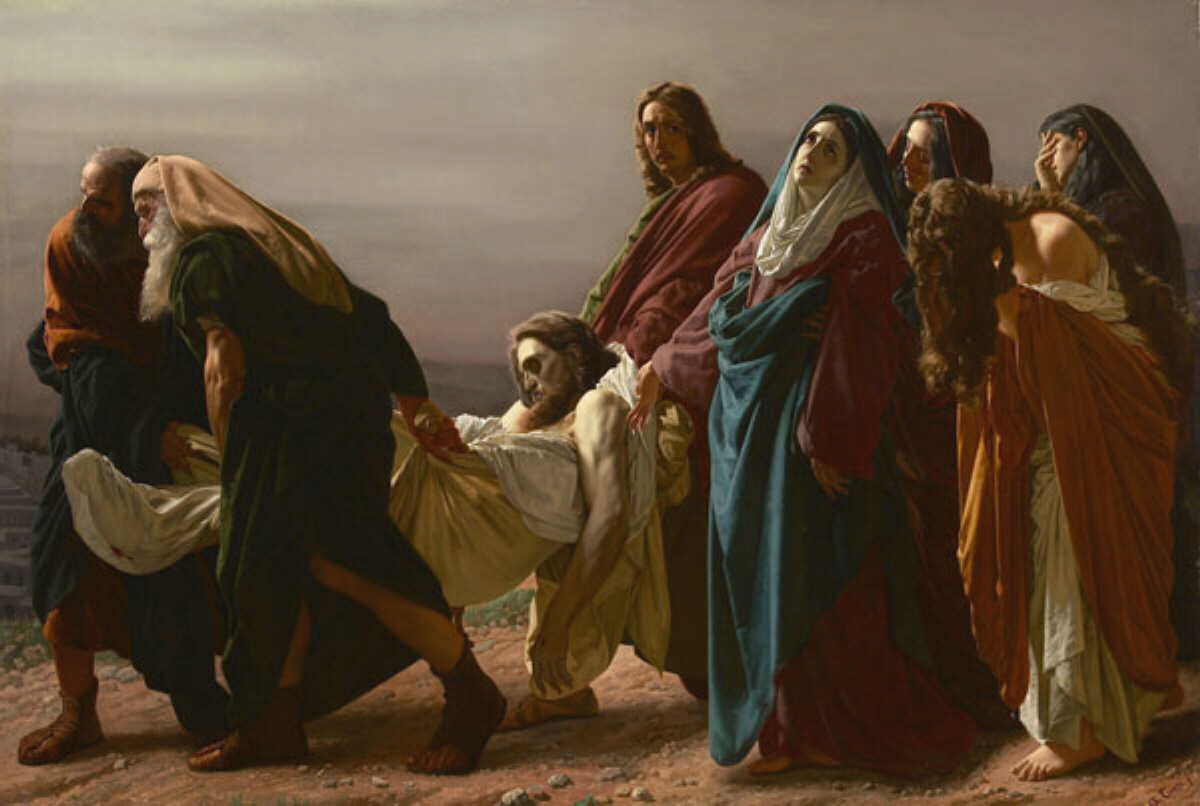
Bearing the Body of Christ to the Sepulchre,
1864–1870
