= Trichotoxon =

Scientific classification
- Kingdom: Animalia
- Phylum: Mollusca
- Class: Gastropoda
- Order: Stylommatophora
- Family: Helicarionidae
- Genus: Trichotoxon; Simroth, 1888

Genus of gastropods

Trichotoxon is a genus of air-breathing land snails or semislugs, terrestrial pulmonate gastropod mollusks in the family Helicarionidae.

== Species ==
Species:

- Trichotoxon heynemanni Simroth, 1889
- Trichotoxon martensi (Heynemann, 1882)
- Trichotoxon prestoni Pollonera, 1911
