= Antonio Costa (geophysicist) =

Italian geophysicist and volcanologist

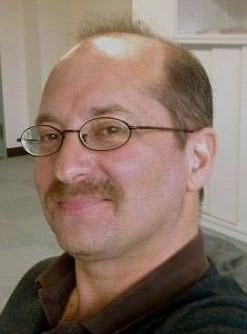
- Citizenship: Italian
- Education: University of Pisa (B.Sc., M.Sc. Physics); University of Bologna (PhD)
- Known for: Physical and numerical modelling of volcanic processes; tephra dispersal modelling; volcanic hazard and risk assessment
- Awards: Wager Medal (2015); Sentinel of Science Award (2016)
- Scientific career
- Fields: Geophysics, Volcanology
- Workplaces: Istituto Nazionale di Geofisica e Vulcanologia (INGV)

Antonio Costa is an Italian geophysicist and volcanologist known for his contributions to the physical and numerical modelling of volcanic processes and for the development of quantitative methods for volcanic hazard assessment. He is a senior researcher at the National Institute of Geophysics and Volcanology (INGV), Perugia branch, and previously served as director of the INGV Bologna section.

His research integrates fluid dynamics, numerical modelling, probabilistic analysis, and high-performance computing to investigate magma ascent processes, lava domes and lava flows, tephra dispersal, pyroclastic density currents, volcanic tsunamis, and quantitative approaches to multi-hazard and multi-risk assessment, with applications relevant to civil protection, aviation safety, and the mitigation of risks to critical infrastructure.

Since 2019, he has appeared annually in the "Top 2% most influential scientists" global ranking produced by Stanford University and Elsevier. Costa has been a member of the Academia Europaea since 2021.

He has also appeared in international scientific documentaries produced by the BBC, Arte, and the History Channel.

== Education and early career ==
Costa received his degree in Physics at the University of Pisa in October 1998 with a thesis on "Rotation of magnetized plasmas during ICHR". Following this, he served as a Teacher of Mathematics and Physics for MIUR in Milan and completed his PhD in Environmental Physics from the University of Bologna in 2004 with a thesis titled "Themo-fluid-dynamic models applied to transport process of volcanic products". During his PhD, he spent 6 months at the Open University, UK, in the framework of an EU Research Training program. He then served as a Postdoc Grant recipient at Istituto Nazionale di Geofisica e Vulcanologia - Osservatorio Vesuviano in Naples, Italy, from January 2004 to May 2005 and subsequently as Research Associate at the University of Bristol from 2005 to 2006, where he was also an honorary research visitor from 2007 to 2010. He continued his research journey as a Permanent Researcher from 2007 to 2010 at Osservatorio Vesuviano, Naples, Italy.

== Career ==
Costa is a senior researcher at the Istituto Nazionale di Geofisica e Vulcanologia of Bologna (INGV), working at the Perugia branch. His work integrates numerical modelling, statistics, fluid dynamics and atmospheric sciences to analyse volcanic processes and assess hazards at multiple scales.

He conducted international research stays at the Earthquake Research Institute of the Earthquake Research Institute at the University of Tokyo in Japan, LMU Munich in Germany, and the University of Nariño in Colombia.

He was a member of the 2019 Legacy Task Force of the Deep Carbon Observatory, coordinated by the Carnegie Institution for Science.

He has also coordinated *Pianeta Dinamico*, the decennial strategic research programme of INGV funded by the Italian Ministry of University and Research (MUR).

Costa has collaborated extensively with international research groups and has served on editorial boards including Annals of Geophysics Editor-in-Chief 2017-2019), Natural Hazards and Earth System Sciences (Topical Editor 2011-2015), and Frontiers in Earth Science.

== Research ==
Costa's research covers a broad spectrum of topics in physical volcanology and volcanic hazard assessment. His main research areas include:

- magma ascent processes
- magmatic degassing
- hydrothermal systems
- eruptive column dynamics
- tephra dispersal and atmospheric transport
- pyroclastic density currents
- volcanic tsunamis
- probabilistic hazard modelling and multi-hazard/multi-risk assessment

He has contributed to the development of volcanic ash dispersal models, including FALL3D, used by several Volcanic Ash Advisory Centres (VAACs) around the world.

== Selected publications ==
- Costa, A. (2006). "Permeability-porosity relationship: A reexamination of the Kozeny–Carman equation based on a fractal pore-space geometry assumption." Geophysical Research Letters, 33(2). doi:10.1029/2005GL025134.
- Costa, A.; Macedonio, G.; Folch, A. (2006). "A three-dimensional Eulerian model for transport and deposition of volcanic ashes." Earth and Planetary Science Letters, 241(3–4), 634–647. doi:10.1016/j.epsl.2005.11.019.
- Costa, A.; Caricchi, L.; Bagdassarov, N. (2009). "A model for the rheology of particle-bearing suspensions and partially molten rocks." Geochemistry, Geophysics, Geosystems, 10(3). doi:10.1029/2008GC002138.
- Costa, A.; Suzuki, Y.J.; Koyaguchi, T. (2018). "Understanding the plume dynamics of explosive super-eruptions." Nature Communications, 9, 654. doi:10.1038/s41467-018-02901-0.
- Smith, V.C.; Costa, A.; Aguirre-Díaz, G. et al. (2020). "The magnitude and impact of the 431 CE Tierra Blanca Joven eruption of Ilopango, El Salvador." Proceedings of the National Academy of Sciences, 117(42), 26061–26068. doi:10.1073/pnas.2000325117.

== Awards and honours ==
- Wager Medal, IAVCEI (2015)
- Sentinel of Science Award (2016)
- Member of the Academia Europaea (elected 2021)
- Listed annually since 2019 among the Elsevier–Stanford "Top 2% most influential scientists"
