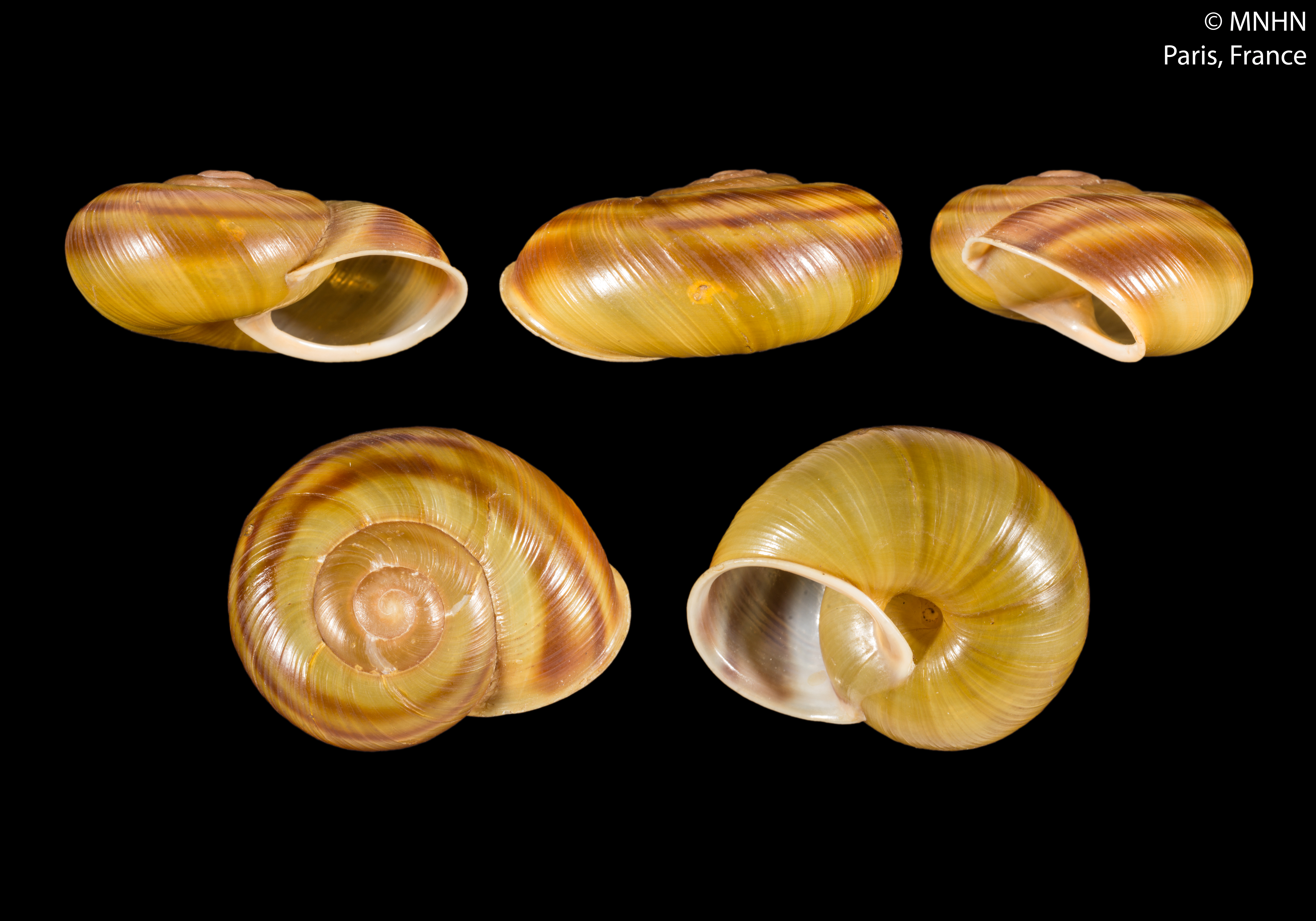
- Shell of Tacheocampylaea cyrniaca (syntype at MNHN, Paris)

Scientific classification
- Domain: Eukaryota
- Kingdom: Animalia
- Phylum: Mollusca
- Class: Gastropoda
- Order: Stylommatophora
- Superfamily: Helicoidea
- Family: Helicidae
- Subfamily: Murellinae
- Genus: Tacheocampylaea

Synonyms
- Helix (Tacheocampylaea) L. Pfeiffer, 1877 (original rank)

= Tacheocampylaea =

Genus of gastropods

Tacheocampylaea is a genus of air-breathing, land snails, terrestrial pulmonate gastropod mollusks in the subfamily Murellinae of the family Helicidae, the typical snails.

== Species ==
Species within the genus Tacheocampylaea include:

- Tacheocampylaea acropachia (Mabille, 1880)
- Tacheocampylaea carotii (Paulucci, 1882)
- Tacheocampylaea cyrniaca (Dutailly, 1867)
- † Tacheocampylaea fabarensis (Tuccimei, 1889)
- Tacheocampylaea insularis (Crosse & Debeaux, 1869)
- Tacheocampylaea raspailii (Payraudeau, 1826)
- Tacheocampylaea romagnolii (Dutailly, 1867)
- Tacheocampylaea tacheoides (Pollonera, 1909)

Synonyms

- †Tacheocampylaea (Mesodontopsis) Pilsbry, 1895: synonym of † Mesodontopsis Pilsbry, 1895
