= Emanuele Trionfi =

Italian painter (1832–1900)

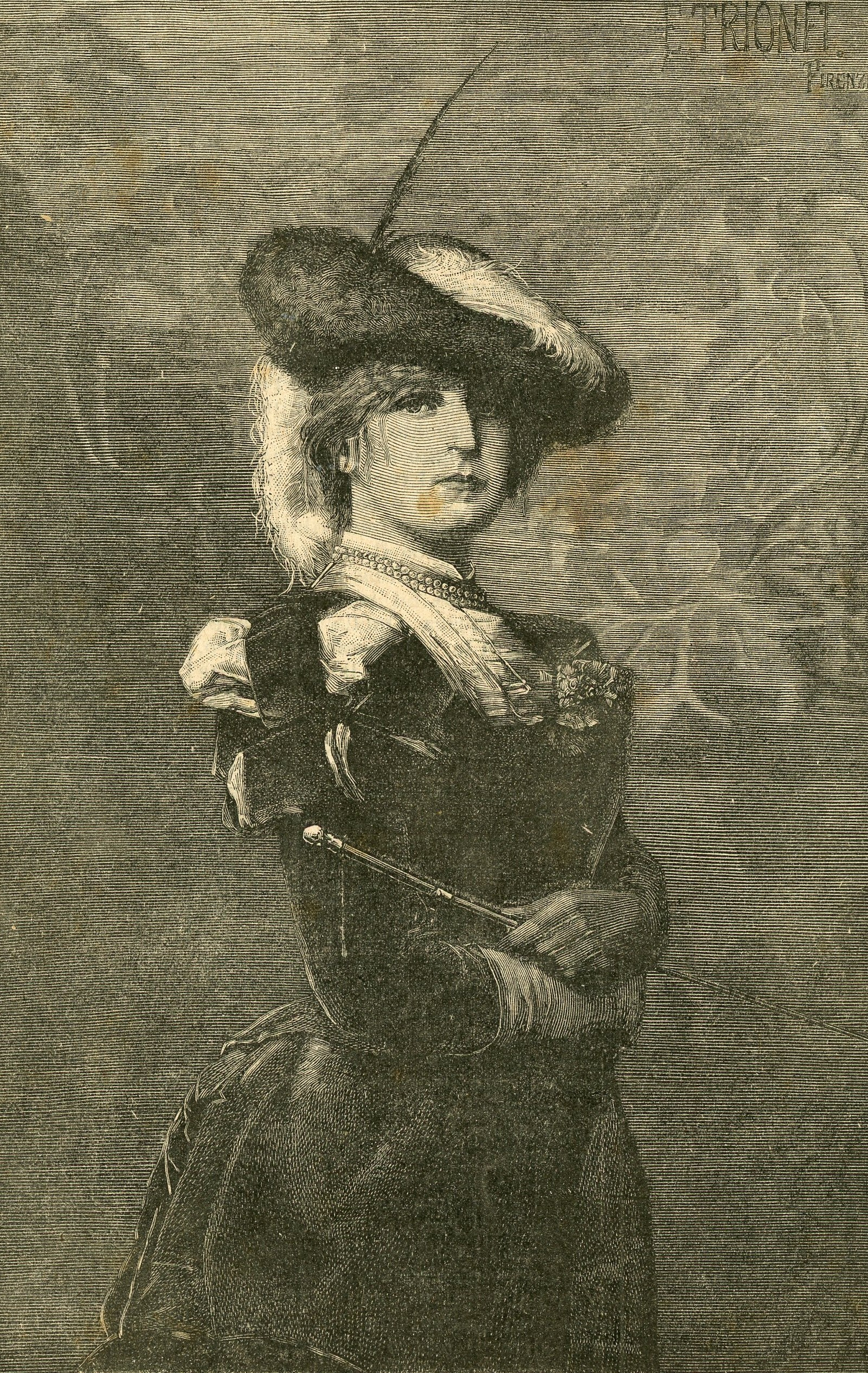
- Born: December 1832; Livorno, Grand Duchy of Tuscany
- Died: 1900; Florence, Italy
- Education: Academy of Fine Arts of Florence
- Known for: Painter
- Movement: Orientalist

Emanuele Trionfi (December 1832 – 1900) was an Italian painter and ceramist.

== Life and career ==
Born in Livorno in 1832, he initially studied design in Livorno. From there, he moved to the Academy of Fine Arts of Florence and studied under professor Antonio Ciseri.

He became professor of design at the Scuole Tecniche Comunali of Florence. He was an honorary associate of the Academy of Fine Arts of Urbino. He died in Florence in 1900.

== Work ==
He was primarily a painter of genre and figures. In 1860, he painted a portrait of the King for the Italian colony in Cairo, Egypt. He also painted literary subjects from the works of Byron and Pietro Grossi; and a half-figure costume genre of Dopo il ballo donated to the Academy of Fine Arts of Florence. In the latter, a young woman after a masked ball, lounges in a chair still in her gay costume. Other genre paintings, include La Freddolosa and l'Estate; and the pair Aspettando and i Preparativi. He also painted ceramics with still lifes of fruit and game, and small figures. For example, a large plate of l'Autunno.

== See also ==
- List of Orientalist artists
- Orientalism
