= Carlo Stratta =

Italian painter (1852–1936)

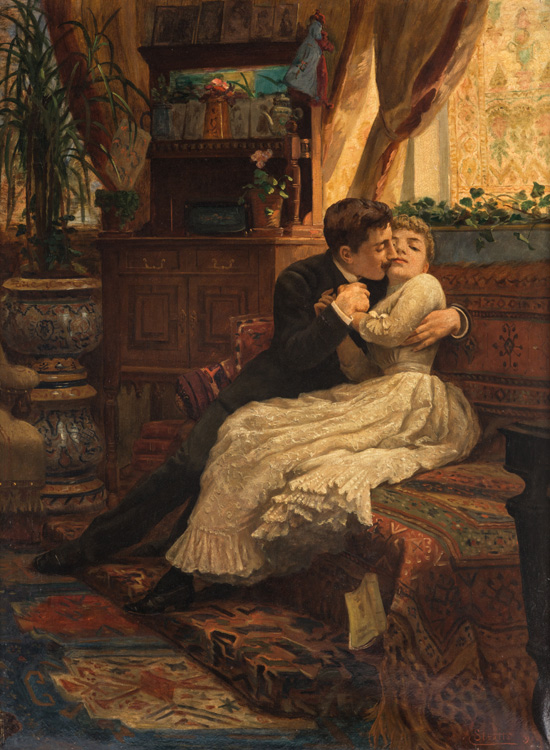
Couple in the Drawing Room (1890), Carlo Stratta, oil on canvas 97 x 71 cm (38 1/8 x 28 in).

Carlo Stratta (13 May 1852–1936) was an Italian painter.

== Biography ==
He was born and resident in Turin. Starting in 1869, he trained under Antonio Fontanesi at the Accademia Albertina. He also later received a degree in Engineering, which he never practiced. He moved to Paris from 1875 to 1884, working under Thomas Couture until 1879. In that year, he exhibited in the Salon of Paris. He also sojourned for six months that year in Cairo, Egypt; this would provide him with models for painting the then-called orientalist subjects. In 1882 at the Salon of Paris, he exhibited La Scena del Carnovale Populare.

He displayed Prima di cominciare at Turin, in 1880. The work Baccanale was exhibited at the 1883 Exposition of Fine Arts in Rome. At the Mostra of Fine Arts in Turin, he displayed: L'École buissonìère; Head of a Nubian; and Bacchanal. He was a colleague of Alberto Falchetti and Ambrogio Raffele.
