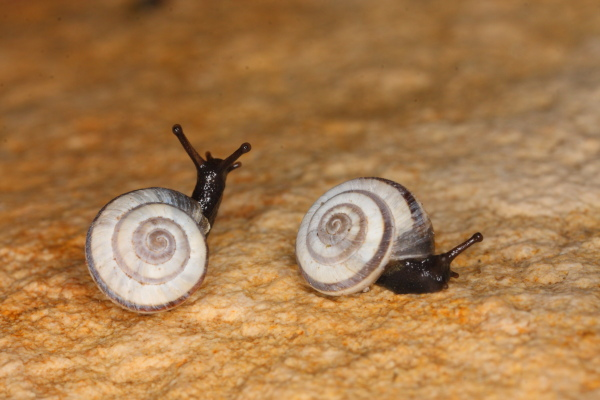
- Two live individuals of Candidula unifasciata

Scientific classification
- Kingdom: Animalia
- Phylum: Mollusca
- Class: Gastropoda
- Order: Stylommatophora
- Family: Geomitridae
- Genus: Candidula; Kobelt, 1871

Type species
- Glischrus (Helix) candidula Studer, 1820

Synonyms
- Xeroalbina Monterosato, 1892; Xerocodia Monterosato, 1892; Xerotringa Monterosato, 1892; Xerovaga Monterosato, 1892

= Candidula =

Genus of gastropods

Candidula is a genus of air-breathing land snails, terrestrial pulmonate gastropod mollusks in the family Geomitridae, . the hairy snails and their allies.

The genus is characterized by the presence of a big dart sac, a sac containing an arrow-like structure found on a land snail's reproductive organs.

== Species ==
Species within the genus Candidula s.l. include:

- Candidula candidescens A. J. Wagner, 1928 (taxon inquirendum)
- Candidula castriota Soós, 1924
- Candidula cavannae (Paulucci, 1881)
- Candidula codia (Bourguignat, 1859)
- Candidula conglomeratica Bodon, Cianfanelli, Chueca & Pfenninger, 2020
- Candidula lernaea Hausdorf, 1991
- †Candidula radigueli (Bourguignat, 1869)
- †Candidula rechodia (Bourguignat, 1862)
- Candidula rhabdotoides (A. J. Wagner, 1928)
- Candidula rugosiuscula (Michaud, 1831)
- † Candidula soosi (Gaál, 1910)
- Candidula syrensis (Pfeiffer, 1846) (taxon inquirendum)
- Candidula unifasciata (Poiret, 1801) - type species
- Candidula verticillata (Pfeiffer, 1871) (taxon inquirendum, generic affiliation unclear)

Species brought into synonymy

- Candidula arganica (Servain, 1880): synonym of Zarateana arganica (Servain, 1880) (invalid combination)
- Candidula belemensis (Servain, 1880): synonym of Xeroplexa belemensis (Servain, 1880)
- Candidula camporroblensis (Fez, 1944): synonym of Backeljaia camporroblensis (Fez, 1944) (invalid combination)
- Candidula corbellai Martínez-Ortí, 2011: synonym of Backeljaia corbellai (Martínez-Ortí, 2011) (original combination)
- Candidula coudensis Holyoak & Holyoak, 2010: synonym of Xeroplexa coudensis (Holyoak & Holyoak, 2010) (original combination)
- Candidula fiorii (Alzona & Alzona Bisacchi, 1938): synonym of Xerogyra fiorii (Alzona & Alzona Bisachii, 1938) (invalid combination)
- Candidula gigaxii (Pfeiffer, 1847): synonym of Backeljaia gigaxii (L. Pfeiffer, 1847) (invalid combination)
- Candidula grovesiana (Paulucci, 1881): synonym of Xerogyra grovesiana (Paulucii, 1881) (invalid combination)
- Candidula intersecta (Poiret, 1801): synonym of Xeroplexa intersecta (Poiret, 1801) (invalid combination)
- Candidula najerensis (Ortiz de Zárate y López, 1950): synonym of Backeljaia najerensis (Ortiz de Zárate y López, 1950) (invalid combination)
- Candidula olisippensis (Servain, 1880): synonym of Xeroplexa olisippensis (Servain, 1880) (invalid combination)
- Candidula rocandioi (Ortiz de Zárate y López, 1950): synonym of Zarateana rocandioi (Ortiz de Zárate y López, 1950) (invalid combination)
- Candidula setubalensis (Pfeiffer, 1850): synonym of Xeroplexa setubalensis (L. Pfeiffer, 1850) (invalid combination)
- Candidula spadae (Calcara, 1845): synonym of Xerogyra spadae (Calcara, 1845) (invalid combination)
- † Candidula striataformis (Lörenthey, 1906): synonym of † Helicella striataformis (Lörenthey, 1906)
- Candidula ultima (Mousson, 1872): synonym of Orexana ultima (Mousson, 1872) (invalid combination)

== Taxonomy ==
Molecular phylogenetic studies revealed the polyphyly of the genus being divided into at least six genera

The species of Candidula s.l. should be classified as follows:

- Backeljaia
  - Backeljaia camporroblensis (Fez, 1944)
  - Backeljaia corbellai (Martínez-Ortí, 2011)
  - Backeljaia gigaxii (Pfeiffer, 1847) type species
  - Backeljaia najerensis (Ortiz de Zárate y López, 1950)
- Candidula
- Orexana
  - Orexana ultima (Mousson, 1872) type species
- Xerogyra
  - Xerogyra fiorii (Alzona & Alzona Bisacchi, 1938)
  - Xerogyra grovesiana (Paulucci, 1881)
  - Xerogyra spadae (Calcara, 1845)
- Xeroplexa
  - Xeroplexa arrabidensis (Holyoak & Holyoak, 2014)
  - Xeroplexa belemensis (Servain, 1880): synonym of Xeroplexa belemensis (Servain, 1880)
  - Xeroplexa carrapateirensis (Holyoak & Holyoak, 2014)
  - Xeroplexa coudensis (Holyoak & Holyoak, 2010)
  - Xeroplexa intersecta (Poiret, 1801)
  - Xeroplexa olisippensis (Servain, 1880)
  - Xeroplexa ponsulensis (Holyoak & Holyoak, 2014)
  - Xeroplexa scabiosula (Locard, 1899)
  - Xeroplexa setubalensis (Pfeiffer, 1850) type species
  - Xeroplexa strucki (Maltzan, 1886)
- Zarateana
  - Zarateana arganica (Servain, 1880) type species
  - Zarateana rocandioi (Ortiz de Zárate y López, 1950)
