= List of non-marine molluscs of Portugal =

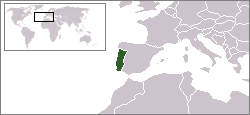
Location of Portugal

The non-marine molluscs of Portugal are a part of the molluscan fauna of Portugal.

There are numerous species of non-marine molluscs living in the wild in Portugal.

== Freshwater gastropods ==
Neritidae

- Theodoxus baeticus (Lamarck, 1822)

Bithyniidae

- Bithynia tentaculata (Linnaeus, 1758)

Hydrobiidae

- Alzoniella rolani (Boeters, 1986)
- Belgrandia alcoaensis C. Boettger, 1963 - endemic to Portugal
- Belgrandia alvaroi G. Holyoak, D. Holyoak & Mendes, 2017 - endemic to Portugal
- Belgrandia heussi C. Boettger, 1963 - endemic to Portugal
- Belgrandia jordaoi G. Holyoak, D. Holyoak & Mendes, 2017 - endemic to Portugal
- Belgrandia lusitanica (Paladilhe, 1867) - endemic to Portugal
- Belgrandia silviae Rolán & Oliveira, 2009 - endemic to Portugal
- Hydrobia glyca (Servain, 1880)
- Iberhoratia conimbrigensii Talaván Serna & Talaván Gómez, 2020 - endemic to Portugal
- Iberhoratia tagomei Talaván Serna, 2019 - endemic to Portugal
- Mercuria tachoensis (Frauenfeld, 1865) - endemic to Portugal

Tateidae

- Potamopyrgus antipodarum (Gray, 1843) - introduced

Valvatidae

- Valvata piscinalis (O.F. Müller, 1774)

Lymnaeidae

- Galba truncatula (O.F. Müller, 1774)
- Pseudosuccinea columella (Say, 1817) - introduced
- Radix auricularia (Linnaeus, 1758)
- Radix balthica (Linnaeus, 1758)
- Stagnicola palustris (O. F. Müller, 1774)

Physidae

- Physa acuta (Draparnaud, 1805) - introduced

Planorbidae

- Ancylus fluviatilis O.F. Müller, 1774
- Anisus spirorbis (Linnaeus, 1758)
- Bathyomphalus contortus (Linnaeus, 1758)
- Bulinus truncatus (Audouin, 1827)
- Ferrissia californica (Rowell, 1863) - introduced
- Gyraulus albus (O.F. Müller, 1774)
- Gyraulus chinensis (Dunker, 1848) - introduced
- Gyraulus crista (Linnaeus, 1758)
- Gyraulus laevis (Alder, 1838)
- Helisoma duryi (Wetherby, 1879) - introduced
- Hippeutis complanatus (Linnaeus, 1758)
- Menetus dilatatus (Gould, 1841) - introduced
- Planorbarius metidjensis (Forbes, 1838)
- Planorbis carinatus O.F. Müller, 1774
- Planorbis planorbis (Linnaeus, 1758)

== Land gastropods ==
Aciculidae

- Platyla lusitanica (D. Holyoak & Seddon, 1985) - endemic to Portugal

Pomatiidae

- Pomatias elegans (O.F. Müller, 1774)
- Tudorella sulcata (Draparnaud, 1805) - introduced

Ellobiidae

- Carychium ibazoricum Bank & E. Gittenberger, 1985
- Leucophytia bidentata (Montagu, 1808)
- Myosotella denticulata (Montagu, 1803)
- Ovatella firminii (Payraudeau, 1827)
- Pedipes dohrni d’Ailly, 1896
- Pseudomelampus exiguus (R.T. Lowe, 1832)

Succineidae

- Oxyloma elegans (Risso, 1826)
- Succinea spec. - introduced
- Succinella oblonga (Draparnaud, 1801)

Cochlicopidae

- Cochlicopa lubrica (O.F. Müller, 1774)
- Cochlicopa lubricella (Porro, 1838)

Chondrinidae

- Chondrina lusitanica (L. Pfeiffer, 1848) - endemic to Portugal
- Granopupa granum (Draparnaud, 1801)

Lauriidae

- Lauria cylindracea (Da Costa, 1778)
- Leiostyla anglica (A. Férussac, 1821)

Pyramidulidae

- Pyramidula jaenensis (Clessin, 1882)
- Pyramidula umbilicata (Montagu, 1803)

Valloniidae

- Acanthinula aculeata (O.F. Müller, 1774)
- Plagyrona angusta D. Holyoak & G. Holyoak, 2012 - introduced
- Plagyrona placida (Shuttleworth, 1852)
- Spermodea lamellata (Jeffreys, 1830)
- Vallonia costata (O.F. Müller, 1774)
- Vallonia pulchella (O.F. Müller, 1774)

Truncatellinidae

- Columella aspera Waldén, 1966
- Truncatellina beckmanni Quintana Cardona, 2010
- Truncatellina callicratis (Scacchi, 1833)

Vertiginidae

- Vertigo antivertigo (Draparnaud, 1801)
- Vertigo pygmaea (Draparnaud, 1801)

Enidae

- Merdigera obscura (O.F. Müller, 1774)

Clausiliidae

- Balea perversa (Linnaeus, 1758)
- Balea heydeni Maltzan, 1881
- Clausilia bidentata (Strøm, 1765)
- Macrogastra rolphii portensis (Luso da Silva, 1871) - endemic to Portugal

Ferussaciidae

- Cecilioides acicula (O.F. Müller, 1774)
- Cecilioides barbozae (Maltzan, 1886) - endemic to Portugal
- Cecilioides clessini (Maltzan, 1886) - endemic to Portugal
- Ferussacia folliculum (Schröter, 1784)

Achatinidae

- Rumina decollata (Linnaeus, 1758)

Testacellidae

- Testacella maugei A. Férussac, 1819

Discidae

- Discus rotundatus (O.F. Müller, 1774)

Helicodiscidae

- Lucilla singleyana (Pilsbry, 1889) - introduced

Punctidae

- Paralaoma servilis (Shuttleworth, 1852)
- Punctum pygmaeum (Draparnaud, 1801)

Euconulidae

- Euconulus alderi (Gray, 1840)
- Euconulus fulvus (O.F. Müller, 1774)

Gastrodontidae

- Aegopinella epipedostoma (Fagot, 1879)
- Aegopinella nitidula (Draparnaud, 1805)
- Aegopinella pura (Alder, 1830)
- Zonitoides arboreus (Say, 1816) - introduced
- Zonitoides nitidus (O.F. Müller, 1774)

Oxychilidae

- Mediterranea hydatina (Rossmässler, 1838)
- Morlina glabra (Rossmässler, 1835)
- Oxychilus alliarius (J.S. Miller, 1822)
- Oxychilus alpedrizensis Holyoak & Mendes, 2022 - endemic to Portugal
- Oxychilus cellarius (O.F. Müller, 1774)
- Oxychilus draparnaudi (Beck, 1837)

Pristilomatidae

- Hawaiia minuscula (Binney, 1841) - introduced
- Vitrea contracta (Westerlund, 1871)

Parmacellidae

- Drusia valenciennii (Webb & Van Beneden, 1836)

Agriolimacidae

- Deroceras agreste (Linnaeus, 1758)
- Deroceras invadens Reise, Hutchinson, Schunack & Schlitt, 2011 - introduced
- Deroceras laeve (O.F. Müller, 1774)
- Deroceras lombricoides (Morelet, 1845)
- Deroceras nitidum (Morelet, 1845)
- Deroceras panormitanum (Lessona & Pollonera, 1882) - introduced
- Deroceras reticulatum (O.F. Müller, 1774)
- Furcopenis circularis Castillejo & Mascato, 1987
- Furcopenis geresiensis (Rodríguez, Castillejo & Outeiro, 1989)

Limacidae

- Lehmannia marginata (O.F. Müller, 1774)
- Lehmannia valentiana (A. Férussac, 1821)
- Limacus flavus (Linnaeus, 1758)
- Limax maximus Linnaeus, 1758

Vitrinidae

- Oligolimax annularis (S. Studer, 1820)
- Vitrina pellucida (O.F. Müller, 1774)

Arionidae

- Arion ater (Linnaeus, 1758)
- Arion fuligineus Morelet, 1845
- Arion hispanicus Simroth, 1886
- Arion intermedius Normand, 1852
- Arion lusitanicus Mabille, 1868
- Arion nobrei Pollonera, 1889
- Geomalacus maculosus Allman, 1843
- Geomalacus anguiformis (Morelet, 1845)
- Geomalacus oliveirae Simroth, 1891

Geomitridae

- Backeljaia gigaxii (L. Pfeiffer, 1847)
- Candidula codia (Bourguignat, 1859) - endemic to Portugal
- Cochlicella acuta (O.F. Müller, 1774)
- Cochlicella barbara (Linnaeus, 1758)
- Cochlicella conoidea (dDraparnaud, 1801)
- Cernuella virgata (Da Costa, 1778)
- Helicella cistorum (Morelet, 1845)
- Microxeromagna lowei (Potiez & Michaud, 1838)
- Ponentina curtivaginata D. Holyoak & G. Holyoak, 2012 - endemic to Portugal
- Ponentina excentrica G. Holyoak & D. Holyoak, 2012
- Ponentina foiaensis G. Holyoak & D. Holyoak, 2012 - endemic to Portugal
- Ponentina grandiducta G. Holyoak & D. Holyoak, 2012 - endemic to Portugal
- Ponentina monoglandulosa D. Holyoak & G. Holyoak, 2012 - endemic to Portugal
- Ponentina octoglandulosa D. Holyoak & G. Holyoak, 2012
- Ponentina papillosa G. Holyoak & D. Holyoak, 2012
- Ponentina platylasia (Castro, 1887) - endemic to Portugal
- Ponentina ponentina (Morelet, 1845)
- Ponentina revelata (Michaud, 1831)
- Ponentina rosai (Castro, 1887)
- Xeroplexa arrabidensis (G. Holyoak & D. Holyoak, 2014) - endemic to Portugal
- Xeroplexa belemensis (Servain, 1880) - endemic to Portugal
- Xeroplexa carrapateirensis (G. Holyoak & D. Holyoak, 2014) - endemic to Portugal
- Xeroplexa coudensis (G. Holyoak & D. Holyoak, 2010) - endemic to Portugal
- Xeroplexa intersecta (Poiret, 1801)
- Xeroplexa olisippensis (Servain, 1880) - endemic to Portugal
- Xeroplexa ponsulensis (D. Holyoak & G. Holyoak, 2014) - endemic to Portugal
- Xeroplexa scabiosula (Locard, 1899)
- Xeroplexa setubalensis (Pfeiffer, 1850) - endemic to Portugal
- Xeroplexa strucki (Maltzan, 1886) - endemic to Portugal
- Xerosecta promissa (Westerlund, 1893)
- Xerosecta reboudiana (Bourguignat, 1863)
- Xerotricha apicina (Lamarck, 1822)
- Xerotricha conspurcata (Draparnaud, 1801)
- Xerotricha jamuzensis (E. Gittenberger & Manga, 1977)
- Xerotricha madritensis (Rambur, 1868)
- Xerotricha vatonniana (Bourguignat, 1867)

Helicidae

- Cepaea nemoralis (Linnaeus, 1758)
- Cornu aspersum (O.F. Müller, 1774)
- Eobania vermiculata (O.F. Müller, 1774) - introduced
- Helicigona lapicida (Linnaeus, 1758)
- Marmorana muralis (O. F. Müller, 1774) - introduced
- Otala lactea (O.F. Müller, 1774)
- Otala punctata (O. F. Müller, 1774) - introduced
- Theba pisana (O.F. Müller, 1774)
  - Theba pisana almogravensis D. Holyoak & G. Holyoak, 2016 - endemic to Portugal
  - Theba pisana pisana (O.F. Müller, 1774)

Hygromiidae

- Portugala inchoata (Morelet, 1845)
- Monacha cartusiana (O.F. Müller, 1774)

Trissexodontidae

- Caracollina lenticula (A. Férussac, 1821)
- Gasullia gasulli (Ortiz de Zárate Rocandio & Ortiz de Zárate López, 1961)
- Gasulliella simplicula (Morelet, 1845)
- Gittenbergeria turriplana (Morelet, 1845) - endemic to Portugal
- Oestophora barbella (Servain, 1880)
- Oestophora barbula (Rossmässler, 1838) - endemic to Portugal
- Oestophora barrelsi Hovestadt & Ripken, 2015 - endemic to Portugal
- Oestophora lusitanica (L. Pfeiffer, 1841)

== Bivalvia ==
Margaritieridae

- Margaritifera margaritifera (Linnaeus, 1758)

Unionidae

- Anodonta anatina (Linnaeus, 1758)
- Anodonta cygnea (Linnaeus, 1758)
- Potomida littoralis (Cuvier, 1798)
- Unio delphinus Spengler, 1793
- Unio tumidiformis Castro, 1885

Cyrenidae

- Corbicula fluminea (O.F. Müller, 1774) - introduced

Sphaeriidae

- Euglesa casertana (Poli, 1791)
- Euglesa henslowana (Sheppard, 1823)
- Euglesa subtruncata (Malm, 1855)
- Musculium lacustre (O. F. Müller, 1774)
- Pisidium amnicum (O.F. Müller, 1774)
- Pisidium milium Held, 1836
- Pisidium nitidum Jenyns, 1832
- Pisidium obtusale (Lamarck, 1818)
- Pisidium personatum Malm, 1855
- Sphaerium corneum (Linnaeus, 1758)

== See also ==
Lists of molluscs of surrounding countries:

- List of non-marine molluscs of Spain
- List of non-marine molluscs of Morocco
