= Spada =

Spada is the Italian word for sword and a surname of Italian origin. It may refer to:

== People ==
- Bernardino Spada (1594–1661), Italian Roman Catholic cardinal; patron of the arts
- Constanza Spada, stage name of Italian actress, singer and model Laura Troschel (1944–2016)
- Ercole Spada (1937–2025), Italian automobile designer
- Fabrizio Spada (1643–1717), Italian Roman Catholic cardinal and Cardinal Secretary of State
- Giambattista Spada (1597–1675), Italian Roman Catholic cardinal
- Giovanni Jacopo Spada (1680–1774), Italian naturalist and pioneering geologist
- Giuliana Spada (born 1971), Italian retired heptathlete
- Ilaria Spada (born 1981), Italian actress and showgirl
- János Spáda (1877–1913), Hungarian architect also known as John Spada
- Katiuscia Spada (born 1981), Italian sport shooter
- Leonello Spada (1576–1622), Italian painter of the Baroque era
- Lorenzo Spada (died 1544), Italian Roman Catholic prelate and Bishop of Calvi Risorta
- Marcantonio M. Spada (born 1970), Italian-British psychologist
- Marcello Spada (1905–1995), Italian film actor
- Michelangelo Spada (fl. 1730), Italian painter
- Mirko Spada (born 1969), Swiss decathlete
- Patricio Spada (born 1993), Argentine footballer
- Robert Spada (fl. 1999–2008), American politician
- Romi Spada, Swiss bobsledder in the early 1950s

== Other uses ==
- Palazzo Spada, a historic palace in Rome
  - Galleria Spada, a museum in the Palazzo Spada
- Palazzo Spada (Terni), a palace the city of Terni, Italy
- Honda VT250 motorcycle, frequently referred to as the Spada
- Spada Codatronca, Italian-built supercar by Spada Vetture Sport
- Cape Spada, the north-western extremity of Crete - see Battle of Cape Spada (World War II)
- Spada Lake, the reservoir of Culmback Dam, Washington state, United States
- Beatmania IIDX 21: Spada, a music video game
- Spada, a character from Japanese tokusatsu series Uchu Sentai Kyuranger
- Cardinal Cesare Spada, a minor character in the novel The Count of Monte Cristo whose fortune is found by protagonist Edmond Dantès

== See also ==
- Spade (disambiguation)
