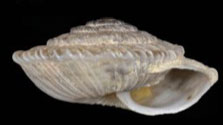
- Apertural view of the shell of Xeroplexa setubalensis

Scientific classification
- Kingdom: Animalia
- Phylum: Mollusca
- Class: Gastropoda
- Order: Stylommatophora
- Family: Geomitridae
- Subfamily: Helicellinae
- Genus: Xeroplexa; Monterosato, 1892

Type species
- Xeroplexa setubalensis Pfeiffer, 1850

Synonyms
- Helicella (Xeroplexa) Monterosato, 1892 · alternate representation

= Xeroplexa =

Genus of gastropods

Xeroplexa is a genus of small, air-breathing land snails, terrestrial pulmonate gastropod mollusks in the subfamily Helicellinae of the family Geomitridae, the hairy snails and their allies.

Xeroplexa species were within genus Candidula until a molecular phylogeny revealed the polyphyly of Candidula, and the genus Xeroplexa Monterosato, 1892 was recovered.

== Distribution ==
The genus is mainly distributed along western Iberian Peninsula, although X. intersecta spreads from northern Iberian Peninsula to central Europe and British Islands.

== Species ==
Species within the genus Xeroplexa include:

- Xeroplexa arrabidensis (Holyoak & Holyoak, 2014)
- Xeroplexa belemensis (Servain, 1880)
- Xeroplexa carrapateirensis (Holyoak & Holyoak, 2014)
- Xeroplexa coudensis (Holyoak & Holyoak, 2010)
- Xeroplexa intersecta (Poiret, 1801)
- Xeroplexa olisippensis (Servain, 1880)
- Xeroplexa ponsulensis (Holyoak & Holyoak, 2014)
- Xeroplexa scabiosula (Locard, 1899)
- Xeroplexa setubalensis (Pfeiffer, 1850) type species
- Xeroplexa strucki (Maltzan, 1886)
