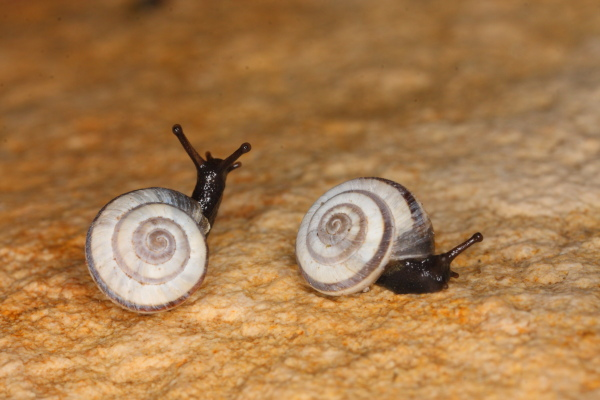
- Two live individuals of Candidula unifasciata

Conservation status
- Least Concern (IUCN 3.1)

Scientific classification
- Kingdom: Animalia
- Phylum: Mollusca
- Class: Gastropoda
- Order: Stylommatophora
- Family: Geomitridae
- Genus: Candidula
- Species: C. unifasciata

Binomial name
- Candidula unifasciata (Poiret, 1801)

Synonyms
- Candidula soosiana (J. Wagner, 1933); Glischrus (Helix) candidula Studer, 1820; Glischrus (Helix) strigata S. Studer, 1820 (junior synonym; non Helix...); Helix (Xerophila) unifasciata Poiret, 1801 (superseded combination); Helix thymorum von Alten, 1812 (junior synonym); Helix unifasciata Poiret, 1801 (original combination)

= Candidula unifasciata =

Species of gastropod

Candidula unifasciata is a species of air-breathing land snail, a terrestrial pulmonate gastropod mollusk in the family Geomitridae.

Subspecies

- Candidula unifasciata acosmia (Bourguignat, 1882)
- Candidula unifasciata soosiana (H. Wagner, 1933)
- Candidula unifasciata unifasciata (Poiret, 1801)
- Candidula unifasciata vincae (De Stefani, 1883)

== Distribution ==
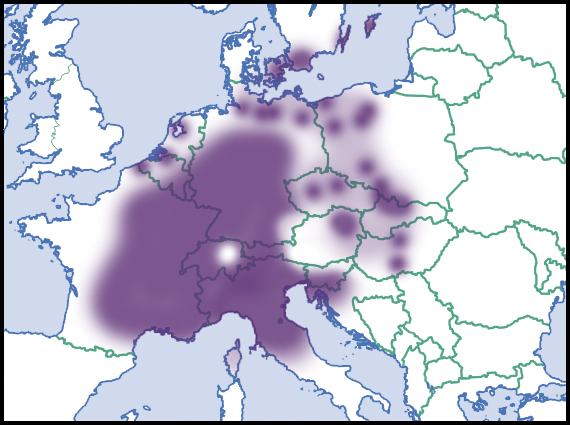
Distribution

This species occurs in European countries and islands including:

- Great Britain
- Netherlands
- France
- Switzerland
- Austria
- Germany
- Poland
- Czech Republic
- Slovakia - in Slovakia it was recognized under the name Candidula soosiana
