= Spade (disambiguation) =

A spade is a digging and gardening tool.

Spade or Spades may also refer to:

== Cards ==
- Spades (card game), a trick-taking card game
- Spades (suit), one of the four French suits commonly used in playing cards

== Music ==
- The Spade, a 2011 studio album by Butch Walker
- "Spade", a song from The Golden Age of Grotesque by Marilyn Manson
- The Spades, first notable band of Roky Erickson

== Places ==
- Spades, Indiana, an unincorporated community
- Spade Township, Knox County, Nebraska, United States
- Spade, Texas, a census designated place
- Spade Ranch (Nebraska), a cattle ranch
- Spade Ranch (Texas), two ranches

== Software ==
- SPAdes (software), a set of tools for genomic sequence assembly
- SMART Process Acceleration Development Environment

== Other uses ==
- Spade (political party), a Ukrainian agrarian party
- Toyota Spade, a variant of the Toyota Porte mini multi-purpose vehicle
- Sam Spade, a fictional detective created by Dashiell Hammett
- Samantha "Sam" Spade, a fictional FBI agent from television series Without a Trace
- Spade, a character from Freedom Planet
- Spade, an otter in Tarka the Otter
- Spade, a form of ancient Chinese coinage
- Spade, an aircraft aileron component
- Spade, an ethnic slur for a black person

== People with the name ==
- Andy Spade, American entrepreneur, brother of David Spade
- Bob Spade (1877–1924), American Major League Baseball pitcher
- David Spade (born 1964), American comedian and actor
- Dean Spade (born 1977), American lawyer, writer and academic
- Doug Spade (born 1951), American politician
- Dudley Spade (born 1956), American politician
- Henri Spade (1921–2008), French journalist, television producer and novelist
- Kate Spade (1962–2018), American designer, co-founder of Kate Spade New York
- Mark Spade, pseudonym of Nigel Balchin (1908–1970), English psychologist, novelist and screenwriter
- Spade Cooley (1910–1969), American Western swing musician, big band leader, actor, and television personality, convicted of murdering his second wife

== See also ==
- Call a spade a spade, a figurative expression, meaning to speak plainly and bluntly
- SPAD (disambiguation)
- Spada (disambiguation)
- Spade House, home of writer H. G. Wells from 1901 to 1909
- Spayed, past tense form of the verb "to spay"
