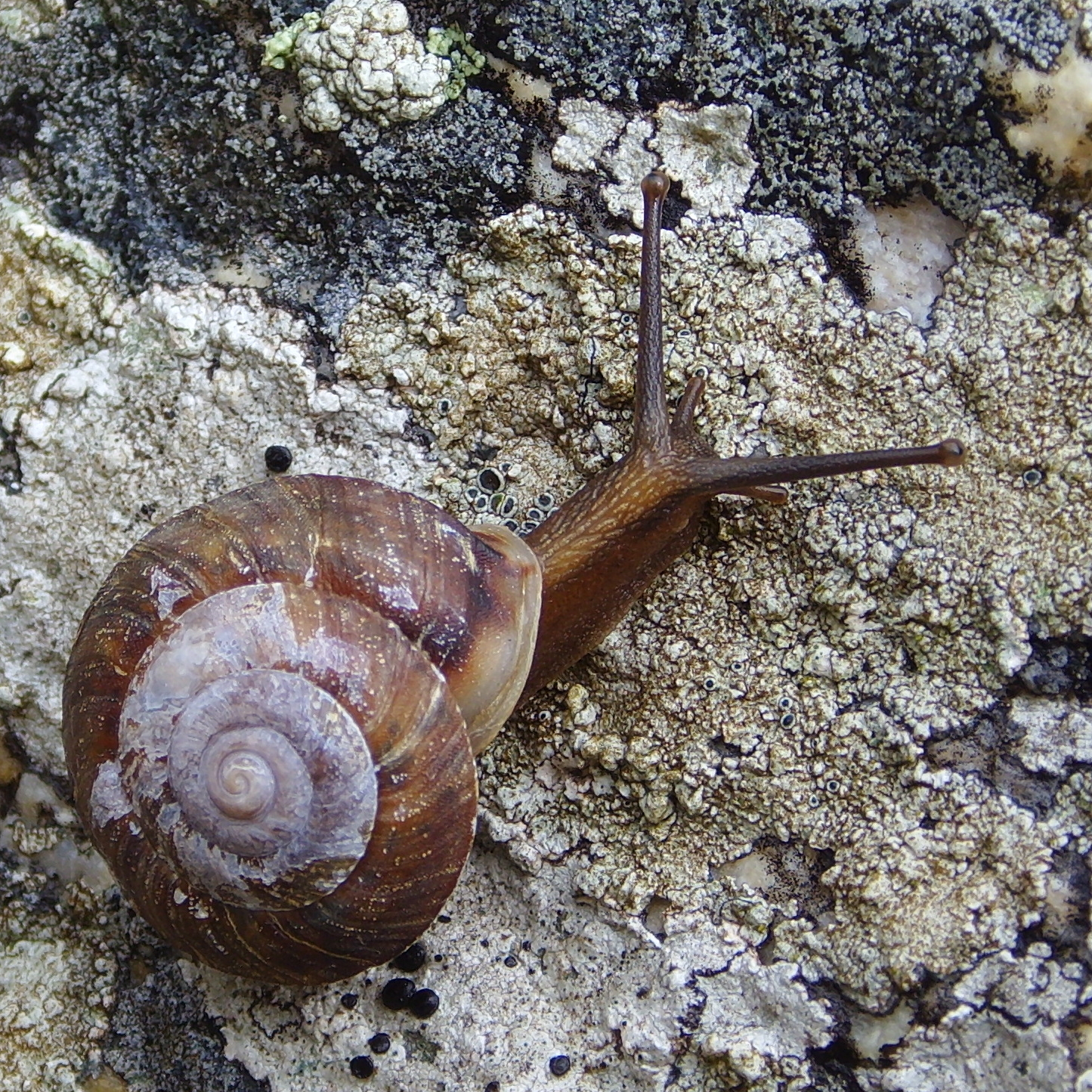
- Helicigona lapicida

Scientific classification
- Kingdom: Animalia
- Phylum: Mollusca
- Class: Gastropoda
- Order: Stylommatophora
- Superfamily: Helicoidea
- Family: Helicidae
- Subfamily: Ariantinae
- Genus: Helicigona; Férussac, 1821

Type species
- Helix lapicida Linnaeus, 1758

Synonyms
- Chilotrema W. Turton, 1831; Helicigona (Helicigona) A. Férussac, 1821· accepted, alternate representation; Helix (Helicigona) Férussac, 1821; †Helicigona (Heliciplana) Schlickum & Strauch, 1970; Latomus Fitzinger, 1833; Lenticula Held, 1838

= Helicigona =

Genus of gastropods

Helicigona is a genus of medium-sized, air-breathing land snails, terrestrial pulmonate gastropod molluscs in the subfamily Ariantinae of the family Helicidae, the typical snails.

== Anatomy ==
These snails create and use love darts during mating.

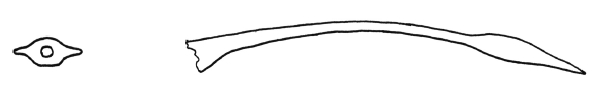
The love dart of Helicigona lapicida

== Species ==
Species within the genus Helicigona include:

- Helicigona kaeufeli Knipper, 1939 (uncertain > taxon inquirendum)
- Helicigona korabensis Subai, 1997 (uncertain > taxon inquirendum)
- Helicigona lapicida (Linnaeus, 1758)

Fossil species

- † Helicigona atava Wenz, 1927
- † Helicigona chaignoni (Locard, 1883)
- † Helicigona planata H. Binder, 2002
- † Helicigona schwarzbachi Schlickum & Strauch, 1979
- † Helicigona wenzi Soós, 1934
