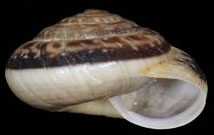
- Apertural view of the shell of Xeroplexa scabiosula

Scientific classification
- Kingdom: Animalia
- Phylum: Mollusca
- Class: Gastropoda
- Order: Stylommatophora
- Family: Geomitridae
- Genus: Xeroplexa
- Species: X. scabiosula

Binomial name
- Xeroplexa scabiosula (Locard, 1899)

Synonyms
- Candidula scabiosula (Locard, 1899); Helix scabiosula Locard, 1899 (original combination)

= Xeroplexa scabiosula =

Species of gastropod

Xeroplexa scabiosula is a species of air-breathing land snail, a terrestrial pulmonate gastropod mollusk belonging to the family Geomitridae.

Although this species was named by Locard (1899), it was treated as synonym of X. belemensis by Gittenberger (1993).

== Description ==
Shells very similar to those of X. arrabidensis and X. belemensis, with a relatively large umbilicus, but shell breadth smaller at maturity and ribs on dorsal surface of body whorl less developed (absent or very weak).

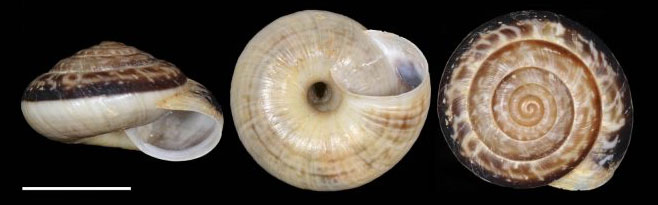
Xeroplexa scabiosula Mocarapacho, Faro (Portugal). Scale bar 0.5 cm.

== Distribution ==
Endemic to Portugal (western Iberian Peninsula), where restricted to limestone districts of central Algarve.
