= Belgrandia silviae =

Conservation status
- Vulnerable (IUCN 3.1)

Scientific classification
- Kingdom: Animalia
- Phylum: Mollusca
- Class: Gastropoda
- Subclass: Caenogastropoda
- Order: Littorinimorpha
- Family: Hydrobiidae
- Genus: Belgrandia
- Species: B. silviae

Binomial name
- Belgrandia silviae Rolán & Oliveira, 2009

Species of gastropod

Belgrandia silviae is a species of very small aquatic snail, an operculate gastropod mollusk in the family Hydrobiidae.

== Distribution ==
Belgrandia silviae is endemic to Portugal, where it is only known from the type locality, the spring of Alcabideque, 10 km to the south of Coimbra in the province of Beira Litoral.
