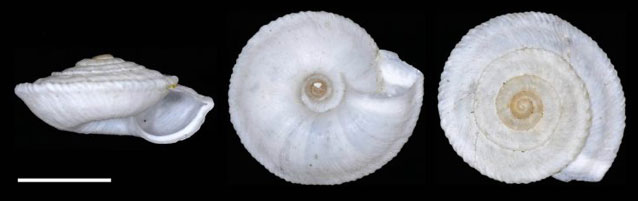
- Xerogyra grovesiana Castrovalva, Gole de Sagittario. L'Aquila (Italy). Scale bar 0.5 cm.

Conservation status
- Endangered (IUCN 3.1)

Scientific classification
- Kingdom: Animalia
- Phylum: Mollusca
- Class: Gastropoda
- Order: Stylommatophora
- Family: Geomitridae
- Genus: Xerogyra
- Species: X. grovesiana

Binomial name
- Xerogyra grovesiana (Paulucci, 1881)

Synonyms
- Candidula grovesiana (Paulucci, 1881) (superseded combination); Helix (Xerophila) grovesiana Paulucci, 1881 (original combination)

= Xerogyra grovesiana =

Species of gastropod

Xerogyra grovesiana is a species of air-breathing land snail, a terrestrial pulmonate gastropod mollusk in the family Geomitridae.

== Distribution ==
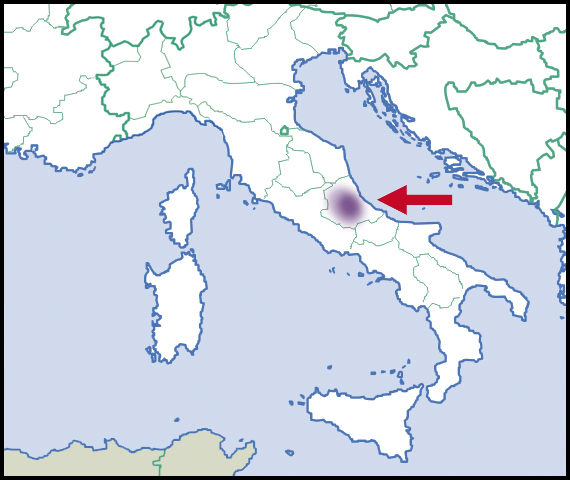
Distribution

This species occurs in Italy.
