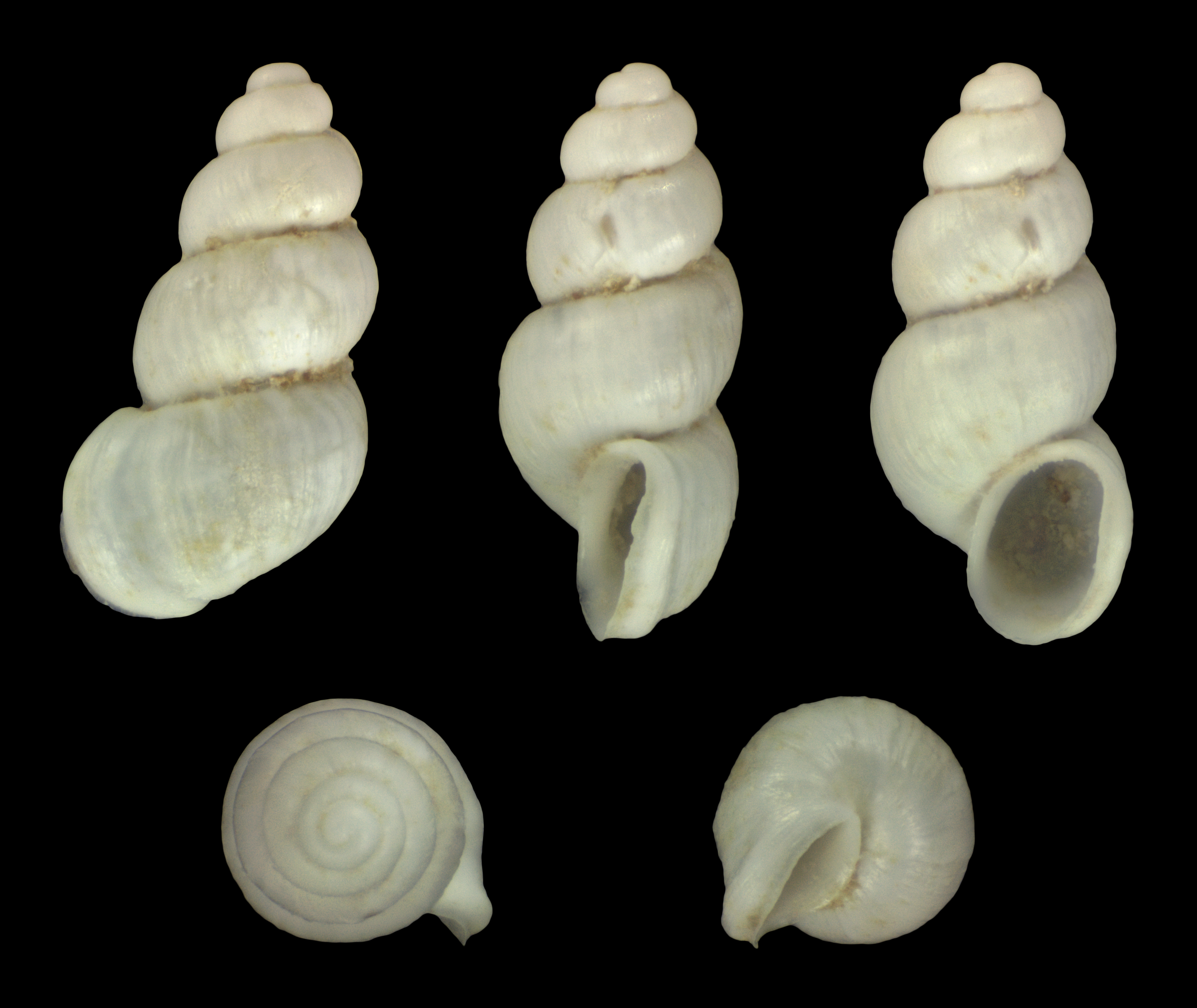
- Belgrandia germanica Clessin, 1878

Scientific classification
- Kingdom: Animalia
- Phylum: Mollusca
- Class: Gastropoda
- Subclass: Caenogastropoda
- Order: Littorinimorpha
- Family: Hydrobiidae
- Subfamily: Belgrandiinae
- Genus: Belgrandia; Bourguignat, 1870

= Belgrandia =

Genus of gastropods

Belgrandia is a genus of very small aquatic snails, operculate gastropod mollusks in the family Hydrobiidae.

== Species ==
Species within the genus Belgrandia include:

- Belgrandia alcoaensis
- Belgrandia bigorrensis
- Belgrandia bonelliana
- Belgrandia boscae
- Belgrandia cazioti
- Belgrandia conoidea
- Belgrandia coutagnei
- Belgrandia depereti
- Belgrandia dunalina
- Belgrandia gfrast
- Belgrandia gibba
- Belgrandia gibberula
- Belgrandia heussi
- Belgrandia ionica
- Belgrandia jordaoi G.A. Holyoak, D.T. Holyoak & da Costa Mendes, 2017
- Belgrandia latina
- Belgrandia lusitanica
- Belgrandia marginata
- Belgrandia mariatheresiae
- Belgrandia minuscula
- Belgrandia moitessieri
- Belgrandia semiplicata
- Belgrandia silviae Rolán & Oliveira, 2009
- Belgrandia sorgica
- Belgrandia sp. nov. 'wiwanensis'
- Belgrandia stochi
- Belgrandia targoniana
- Belgrandia thermalis
- Belgrandia torifera (Dalmatian Belgrande)
- Belgrandia varica (Paget, 1854)
- Belgrandia zilchi
