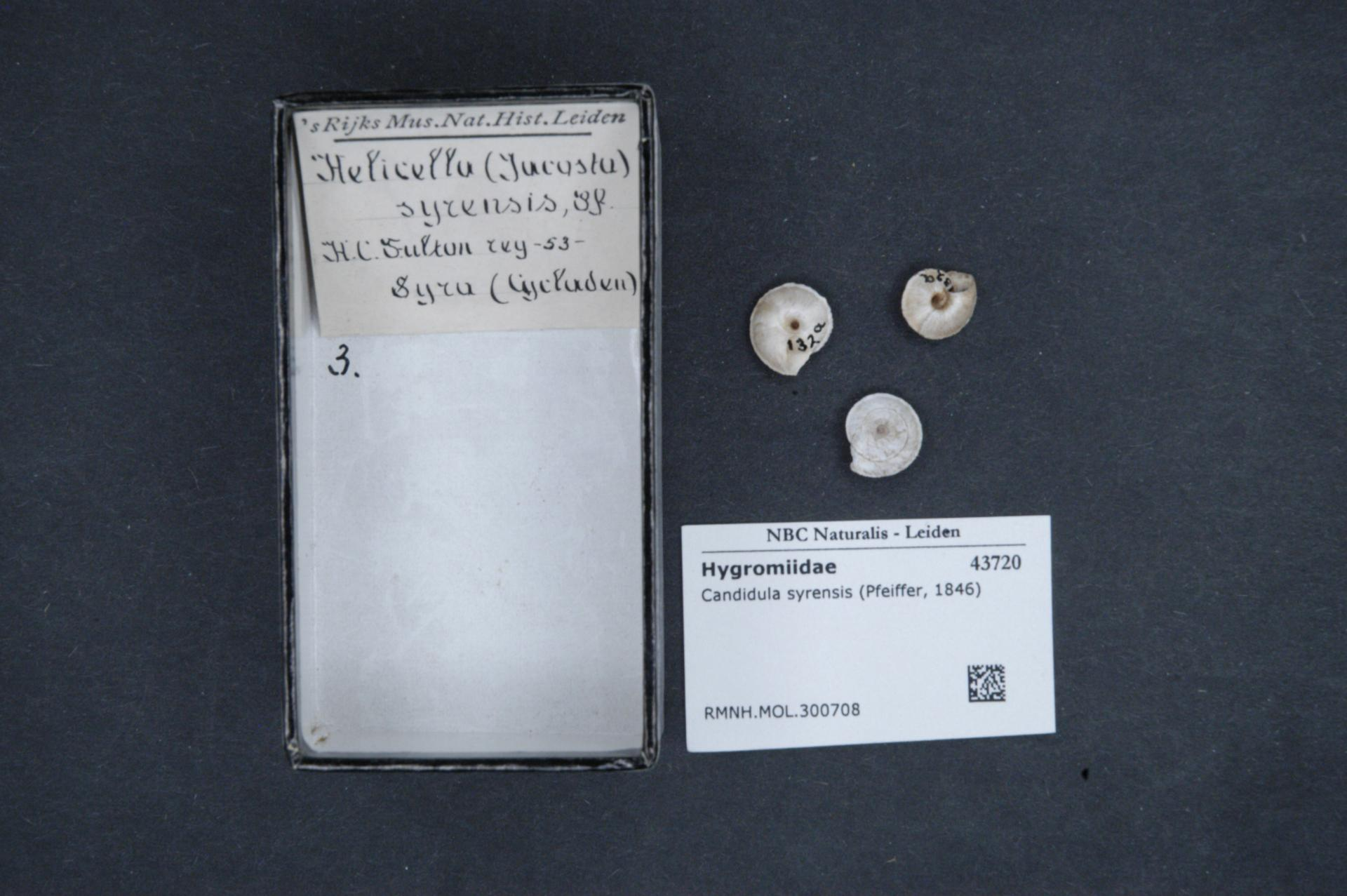
- Shell of Candidula syrensis (specimen at Naturalis Biodiversity Center)

Conservation status
- Least Concern (IUCN 3.1)

Scientific classification
- Kingdom: Animalia
- Phylum: Mollusca
- Class: Gastropoda
- Order: Stylommatophora
- Family: Geomitridae
- Genus: Candidula
- Species: C. syrensis

Binomial name
- Candidula syrensis (L. Pfeiffer, 1846)

Synonyms
- Helicella (Jacosta) syrensis (L. Pfeiffer, 1846) (unaccepted combination ); Helicella syrensis (L. Pfeiffer, 1846) (superseded combination); Helix syrensis L. Pfeiffer, 1846 (original combination); Trochoidea (Trochoidea) syrensis (L. Pfeiffer, 1846)

= Candidula syrensis =

Species of gastropod

Candidula syrensis is a species of air-breathing land snail, a terrestrial pulmonate gastropod mollusk in the family Geomitridae, the hairy snails and their allies.

== Distribution ==
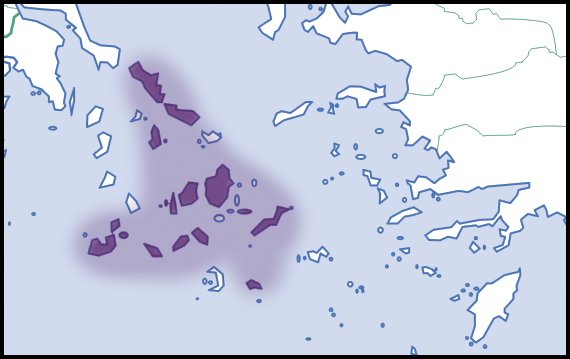
Distribution

This species occurs in Greece.
