= Candidula rhabdotoides =

Conservation status
- Least Concern (IUCN 3.1)

Scientific classification
- Kingdom: Animalia
- Phylum: Mollusca
- Class: Gastropoda
- Order: Stylommatophora
- Family: Geomitridae
- Genus: Candidula
- Species: C. rhabdotoides

Binomial name
- Candidula rhabdotoides (A. J. Wagner, 1928)

Synonyms
- Helicella rhabdotoides (A. J. Wagner, 1928) (invalid combination); Martha rhabdotoides A. J. Wagner, 1928 (original combination)

Species of land snail

Candidula rhabdotoides is a species of air-breathing land snail, a terrestrial pulmonate gastropod mollusk in the family Geomitridae, the hairy snails and their allies.

== Distribution ==
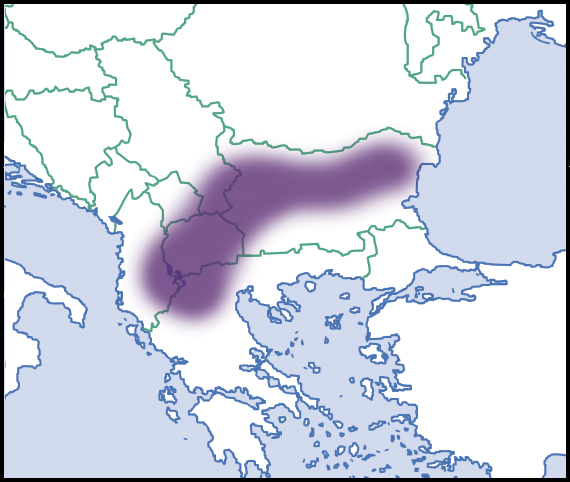
Distribution

This species occurs in Bulgaria.
