= SPAD =

SPAD may refer to:

== Science and technology ==
- Signal passed at danger by a train
- Simple Plastic Airplane Design, a type of radio-controlled model airplane
- Single-photon avalanche diode, a photodetector
- Single Pass Albumin Dialysis, liver dialysis
- SPAD (programming language), used by FriCAS symbolic algebra system

== Military ==
- SPAD VII, SPAD S.XII and SPAD S.XIII, French fighter planes of World War I produced by Société Pour L'Aviation et ses Dérivés
- A-1 Skyraider, nicknamed Spad, an attack aircraft (1950s and 1960s)
- Self-propelled air defence, weapons

== Other uses ==
- Société Pour L'Aviation et ses Dérivés, also Société Provisoire des Aéroplanes Deperdussin and Blériot-SPAD, French aircraft manufacturer (1912–1921)
- SpAd (Special adviser (UK)), a temporary civil servant, a government post
- Suruhanjaya Pengangkutan Awam Darat, the Land Public Transport Agency of Malaysia

== See also ==
- Spade (disambiguation)
