= Belgrandia varica =

Conservation status
- Critically Endangered (IUCN 3.1)

Scientific classification
- Kingdom: Animalia
- Phylum: Mollusca
- Class: Gastropoda
- Subclass: Caenogastropoda
- Order: Littorinimorpha
- Family: Hydrobiidae
- Genus: Belgrandia
- Species: B. varica

Binomial name
- Belgrandia varica (Paget, 1854)

Species of gastropod

Belgrandia varica is a species of small freshwater snail with an operculum, an aquatic gastropod mollusc or micromollusc in the family Hydrobiidae.

Belgrandia varica was previously considered to be extinct, however it has been classified as Critically Endangered (Possibly Extinct) by IUCN because it might still be present in a small spring that has been overlooked during previous surveys.

== Distribution ==
This species is endemic to France.
