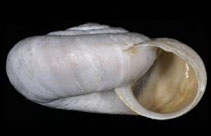
- Apertural view of the shell of Xerogyra spadae

Scientific classification
- Kingdom: Animalia
- Phylum: Mollusca
- Class: Gastropoda
- Order: Stylommatophora
- Family: Geomitridae
- Genus: Xerogyra; Monterosato, 1892

Type species
- Helix spadae Calcara, 1845

= Xerogyra =

Genus of land snails

Xerogyra is a genus of small, air-breathing land snails, terrestrial pulmonate gastropod mollusks in the family Geomitridae.

The genus is distributed in the Italian Peninsula. Xerogyra species were within the genus Candidula until a molecular phylogeny revealed the polyphyly of Candidula and, the genus Xerogyra Monterosato, 1892 was recovered.

== Species ==
Species within the genus Xerogyra include:

- Xerogyra fiorii (Alzona & Alzona Bisacchi, 1938)
- Xerogyra grovesiana (Paulucci, 1881)
- Xerogyra spadae (Calcara, 1845)
