= Candidula verticillata =

Scientific classification
- Kingdom: Animalia
- Phylum: Mollusca
- Class: Gastropoda
- Order: Stylommatophora
- Family: Geomitridae
- Genus: Candidula
- Species: C. verticillata

Binomial name
- Candidula verticillata (Pfeiffer, 1871)

Species of gastropod

Candidula verticillata is a species of air-breathing land snail, a terrestrial pulmonate gastropod mollusk in the family Geomitridae, the hairy snails and their allies.

This is a taxon inquirendum.

== Distribution ==
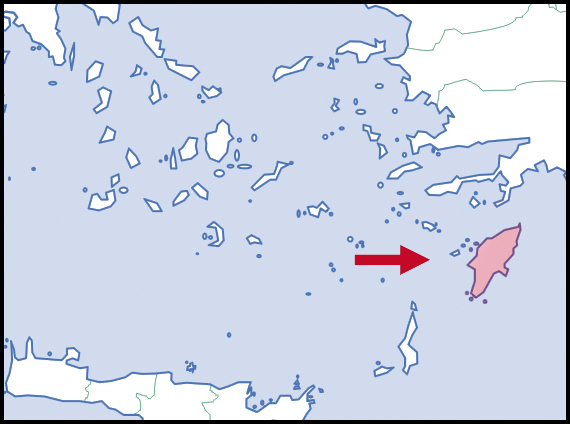
Distribution

This species occurs in Greece.
