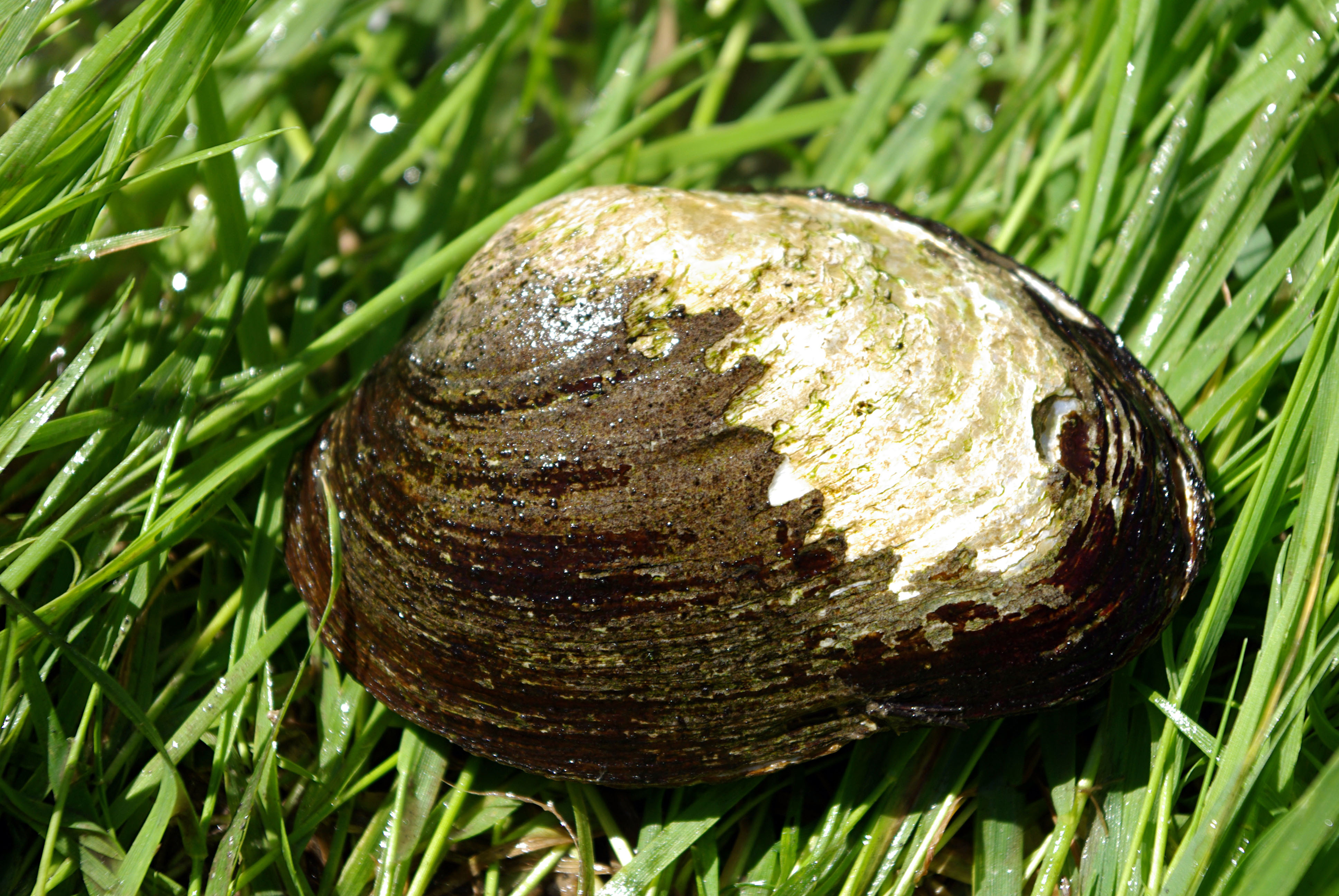
- Potomida littoralis

Scientific classification
- Kingdom: Animalia
- Phylum: Mollusca
- Class: Bivalvia
- Order: Unionida
- Superfamily: Unionoidea
- Family: Unionidae
- Genus: Potomida; Swainson, 1840

Type species
- Mysca (Potomida) corrugata Swainson, 1840

Synonyms
- Mysca (Potomida) Swainson, 1840 (original rank); Potomida (Potomida) Swainson, 1840; † Potomida (Wenziella) Modell, 1958 (junior subjective synonym); Rhombunio Germain, 1911; † Rytia Stefanescu, 1896 (subjective synonym); † Sabbaia Cossmann, 1897; † Sulcopotomida Starobogatov, 1970 (junior subjective synonym); † Unio (Rytia) Stefanescu, 1896 (subjective synonym); † Unio (Wenziella) Modell, 1958 (junior subjective synonym); † Wenziella Modell, 1958 (junior subjective synonym)

= Potomida =

Genus of bivalves

Potomida is a genus of bivalves belonging to the subfamily Gonideinae of the family Unionidae.

The species of this genus are found in Eurasia.

== Species ==
- †Potomida acarnanica (Kobelt, 1879)
- †Potomida attica (Gaudry & P.Fischer, 1867)
- †Potomida berbestiensis (Fontannes, 1886)
- †Potomida bielzi (Czekelius, 1864)
- † Potomida breastensis (Ionescu-Argetoaia, 1918)
- † Potomida clivosa (Brusina, 1874)
- †Potomida cymatoides (Brusina, 1874)
- † Potomida gorjensis (Teisseyre, 1911)
- † Potomida herjei (Porumbaru, 1881)
- † Potomida intepei Taner, 1997
- † Potomida kinzelbachi Schütt, 1988
- Potomida littoralis (Cuvier, 1798)
- † Potomida loewenecki Modell, 1950 (uncertain, unassessed)
- † Potomida mactraeformis (Ionescu-Argetoaia, 1918) (temporary name, junior homonym of Unio mactraeformis Brusina, 1902; no replacement name or synonym known)
- † Potomida ovata Chepalyga (uncertain, unassessed)
- † Potomida ponderosa (Wenz, 1942)
- † Potomida prominula (Stefanescu, 1889)
- † Potomida seljani (Brusina, 1902)
- Potomida semirugata (Lamarck, 1819)
- †Potomida slanicensis (Teisseyre, 1907)
- † Potomida stachei (Neumayr, 1875)
- † Potomida subclivosa (Teisseyre, 1911)
- † Potomida subrectangularis (Blanckenhorn, 1927)
- † Potomida tanaica Modell, 1950 (uncertain, unassessed)
- † Potomida vukotinovici (M.Hörnes, 1870)
- † Potomida wilhelmi (Penecke, 1883)

Synonyms

- Potomida altecarinatus (Penecke, 1883) †: synonym of Potomida altecarinata (Penecke, 1883) † (unaccepted > incorrect grammatical agreement of specific epithet)
- Potomida craiovensis (Tournouër, 1880) †: synonym of Psilunio craiovensis (Tournouër, 1880) †
- Potomida delesserti (Bourguignat, 1852): synonym of Potomida semirugata (Lamarck, 1819)
- Potomida mactreformis [sic] †: synonym of Potomida mactraeformis (Ionescu-Argetoaia, 1918) †
- Potomida neumayri (Penecke, 1883) †: synonym of Potomida jurisici (Brusina, 1896) † (unaccepted > junior homonym)
- Potomida ottiliae (Penecke, 1883) †: synonym of Psilunio (Psilunio) ottiliae (Penecke, 1883) † represented as Psilunio ottiliae (Penecke, 1883) † (unaccepted > superseded combination)
- Potomida prominulus [sic] †: synonym of Potomida prominula (Stefanescu, 1889) † (incorrect gender of specific epithet)
- Potomida slavonicus (M. Hörnes, 1865) †: synonym of Potomida slavonica (M. Hörnes, 1865) † (unaccepted > incorrect grammatical agreement of specific epithet)
- Potomida sturi (M. Hörnes, 1865) †: synonym of Bogatschevia sturi (M. Hörnes, 1865) † (unaccepted > superseded combination)
- Potomida tracheae (Kobelt & Rolle, 1895): synonym of Potomida semirugata (Lamarck, 1819)
- Potomida vukasovicianus (Brusina, 1874) †: synonym of Rytia vukasoviciana (Brusina, 1874) † (unaccepted > superseded combination)
