= Xeroplexa strucki =

Scientific classification
- Kingdom: Animalia
- Phylum: Mollusca
- Class: Gastropoda
- Order: Stylommatophora
- Family: Geomitridae
- Genus: Xeroplexa
- Species: X. strucki

Binomial name
- Xeroplexa strucki (Maltzan, 1886)

Synonyms
- Candidula strucki (Maltzan, 1886)

Species of gastropod

Xeroplexa strucki is a species of air-breathing land snail, a terrestrial pulmonate gastropod mollusk in the family Geomitridae. Although named by Maltzan (1886), no differences from X. olisippensis were indicated and Gittenberger (1993: 285) therefore treated them as synonyms. However, the present study has revealed that the W. Algarve populations named as strucki and similar snails from the coast of W. Baixo Alentejo differ consistently in having a much shorter penial flagellum.

== Description ==
Much like some populations of X. olisippensis in shell characters, being rather small and typically with a very narrow or narrow umbilicus, but several populations have the umbilicus larger. Shells of this species were figured as X. olisippensis by several authors.

== Distribution ==
Endemic in southwestern Portugal where known only in W. Algarve (over limestone and on sandy coastal slopes) and on coastal sands of W. Baixo Alentejo northwards to Costa de San André.
