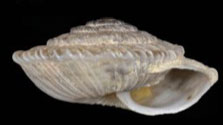
- Apertural view of the shell of Xeroplexa setubalensis

Conservation status
- Endangered (IUCN 3.1)

Scientific classification
- Kingdom: Animalia
- Phylum: Mollusca
- Class: Gastropoda
- Order: Stylommatophora
- Family: Geomitridae
- Genus: Xeroplexa
- Species: X. setubalensis

Binomial name
- Xeroplexa setubalensis (Pfeiffer, 1850)

Synonyms
- Candidula setubalensis Pfeiffer, 1850; Helix serrula Morelet, 1845; Helix Setubalensis Pfeiffer, 1850

= Xeroplexa setubalensis =

Species of gastropod

Xeroplexa setubalensis is a species of air-breathing land snail, a terrestrial pulmonate gastropod mollusk in the family Geomitridae.

The taxa was previously placed within the genus Candidula until a molecular phylogenetic study revealed its current status. This taxon is the type species of the genus Xeroplexa.

== Description ==
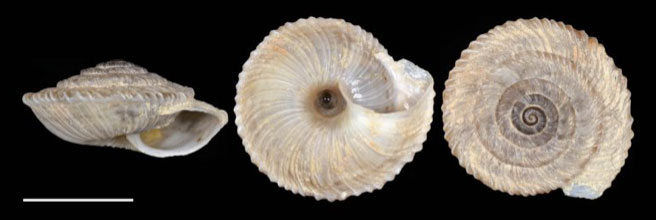
Xeroplexa setubalensis Serra da Arrábida, Setúbal (Portugal). Scale bar 0.5 cm.

== Distribution ==
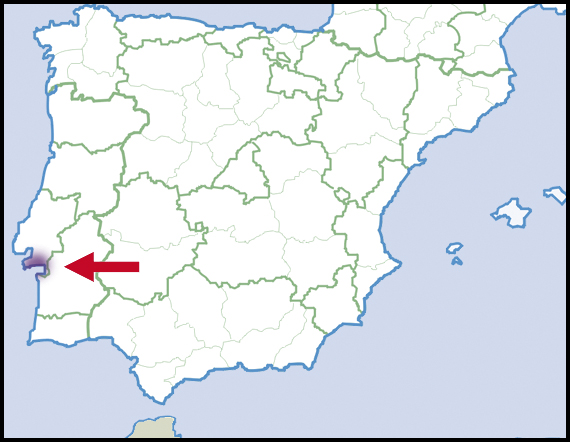
Distribution

X. setubalensis is endemic to the central coast of Portugal (western Iberian Peninsula). Only few populations are known from Serra da Arrábida and Serra do São Luís, placed in the right side of Sado river.

The subspecies Xeroplexa setubalensis amanda (Bourguignat, 1864) occurs off Oran, Algeria.
