= Giovanni Jacopo Spada =

Giovanni Jacopo Spada (1680 – 1774) was an Italian naturalist and pioneering geologist, born in Verona, who served for many years as archipresbyter at Graz in Styria. He is known for the revised and expanded catalogue of his collection that he published in 1744, Corporum lapidefactorum agri veronensis catalogus quæ apud Joan. Jacobum Spadam Gretianae Archipresbyterum Aasservantur A first version, now very rare, had been published in 1739. His dissertation of 1737 at the University of Verona asserted that fossils, then known as petrifications, of recognizably marine species, to be found in the mountains near Verona, were neither "sports of Nature" nor the products of the biblical Great Deluge, but antediluvian. He was listed among the subscribers to the corpus of Latin inscriptions assembled at Verona (and other north Italian locations), the Museum Veronense hoc est antiquarum inscriptionum atque anaglyphorum... (Verona 1749).

Though Spada is barely remembered today, he was commemorated in the snail Candidula spadae, described by Pietro Calcara in 1845.
