= Zarateana rocandioi =

Conservation status
- Least Concern (IUCN 3.1)

Scientific classification
- Kingdom: Animalia
- Phylum: Mollusca
- Class: Gastropoda
- Order: Stylommatophora
- Family: Geomitridae
- Genus: Zarateana
- Species: Z. rocandioi

Binomial name
- Zarateana rocandioi (Ortiz de Zárate y López, 1950)

Synonyms
- Candidula rocandioi (Ortiz de Zárate López, 1950) (invalid combination)

Species of gastropod

Zarateana rocandioi is a species of air-breathing land snail, a terrestrial pulmonate gastropod mollusk in the family Geomitridae.

== Distribution ==
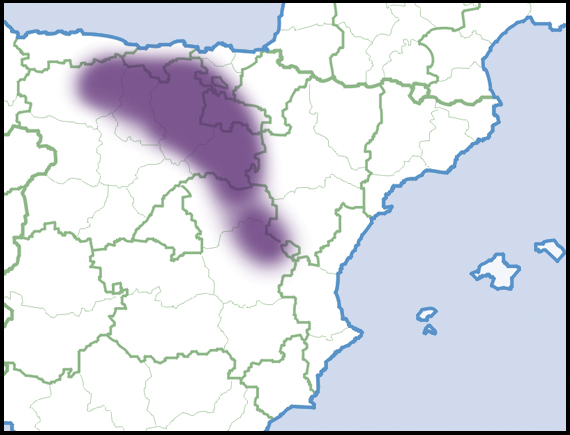
Distribution

This species occurs in Spain.
