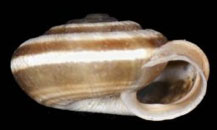
- Apertural view of the shell of Zarateana arganica

Conservation status
- Least Concern (IUCN 3.1)

Scientific classification
- Kingdom: Animalia
- Phylum: Mollusca
- Class: Gastropoda
- Order: Stylommatophora
- Family: Geomitridae
- Genus: Zarateana
- Species: Z. arganica

Binomial name
- Zarateana arganica (Servain, 1880)

Synonyms
- Helix arganica Servain, 1880; Candidula arganica (Servain, 1880)

= Zarateana arganica =

Species of gastropod

Zarateana arganica is a species of air-breathing land snail, a terrestrial pulmonate gastropod mollusk in the family Geomitridae.

== Distribution ==
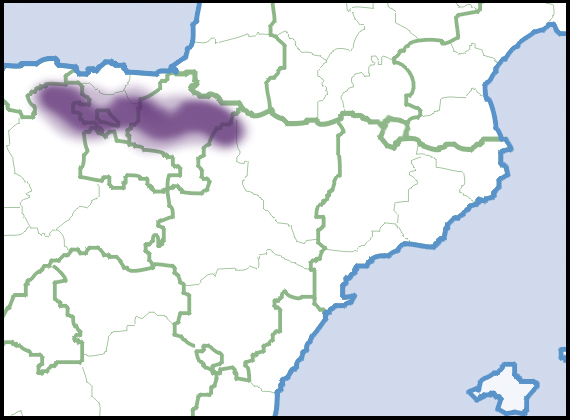
Distribution

This species is endemic to mainland Spain, being found in the north of the Iberian Peninsula. This species ranges from northwest Huesca to north Burgos, its range coinciding with the transition area from the Cantabrian temperate broadleaf and mixed forest, a part of "Green Spain", to the Mediterranean faunal zones.

== Description ==
The shell of Zarateana arganica is greyish white in color. There are brown color bands on the shell which resemble horn. The shell is lustrous and has fine striae. Fresh shells have short structures resembling hairs.

There are whorls which are, to some extent, convex in shape. The last whorl is not much broader than precedent whorls.

The main opening of the shell or the aperture is sometimes quadrangular in shape. There is a sharp lip inside the aperture which is white in color. The umbilicus is clearly visible, open and wide.

The width of the shell is 4.5-5.5 mm. The height of the shell is 2.5–3 mm.

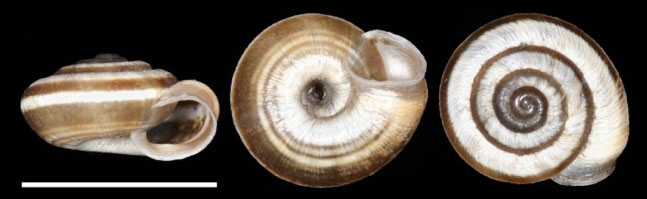
Zarateana arganica Berrostegieta, Álava (Spain). Scale bar 0.5 cm.

== Habitat ==
Zarateana arganica is a terrestrial mollusc. It lives in open places which receive a lot of sunlight, primarily in meadows or grasslands. However, it is also found in riverbanks and forests.

== Interaction with humans and threats ==
Zarateana arganica is not used by humans for food or any other activity. Hence no trading activity is associated with this species.

Urban planning and activities associated with the primary sector of the economy such as agriculture and forestry pose the main risks to this species. The sub-populations of the species also face threat from fire. In the IUCN Red List, Z. arganica is listed as "Least Concern". According to the IUCN, "Although this species has a restricted range, it does not meet either population decline or range decline criteria."

No population study was done on Z. arganica. However, according to the IUCN Red List, the population trend is considered to be stable.
