= Backeljaia camporroblensis =

Conservation status
- Least Concern (IUCN 3.1)

Scientific classification
- Domain: Eukaryota
- Kingdom: Animalia
- Phylum: Mollusca
- Class: Gastropoda
- Order: Stylommatophora
- Family: Geomitridae
- Genus: Backeljaia
- Species: B. camporroblensis

Binomial name
- Backeljaia camporroblensis (Fez, 1944)

Synonyms
- Candidula camporroblensis (Fez, 1944) (invalid combination)

Species of gastropod

Backeljaia camporroblensis is a species of air-breathing land snail, a terrestrial pulmonate gastropod mollusc in the family Geomitridae.

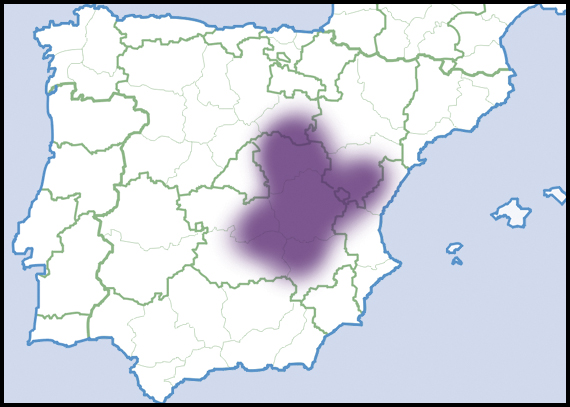
Distribution
