= Backeljaia najerensis =

Conservation status
- Least Concern (IUCN 3.1)

Scientific classification
- Domain: Eukaryota
- Kingdom: Animalia
- Phylum: Mollusca
- Class: Gastropoda
- Order: Stylommatophora
- Superfamily: Helicoidea
- Family: Geomitridae
- Genus: Backeljaia
- Species: B. najerensis

Binomial name
- Backeljaia najerensis (Ortiz de Zárate y López, 1950)

Synonyms
- Candidula najerensis (Ortiz de Zárate López, 1950) (invalid combination)

Species of gastropod

Backeljaia najerensis is a species of air-breathing land snail, a terrestrial pulmonate gastropod mollusk in the family Geomitridae.

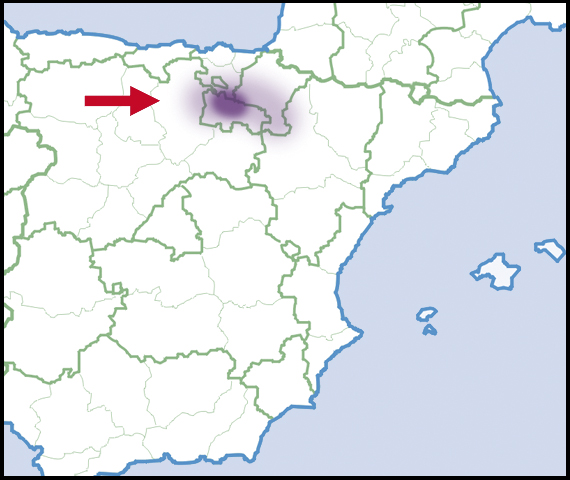
Distribution
