= Patricio Spada =

Argentine professional footballer

Personal information
- Full name: Patricio Iván Spada
- Date of birth: 29 May 1993 (age 33)
- Place of birth: Buenos Aires, Argentina
- Height: 1.88 m (6 ft 2 in)
- Position: Forward

Team information
- Current team: Deportivo Español

Youth career
- San Lorenzo
- 2014: Peñarol

Senior career*
Years	Team	Apps	(Gls)
2014	Almirante Brown	3	(0)
2015	Tristán Suárez	7	(0)
2016	Deportivo Español	3	(0)
2016–2017	Abano	3	(0)
2017–	Deportivo Español	10	(0)
- * Club domestic league appearances and goals as of 12:32, 30 May 2019 (UTC)

Patricio Iván Spada (born 29 May 1993) is an Argentine professional footballer who plays as a forward for Deportivo Español.

== Career ==
Spada played in the youth of San Lorenzo in Argentina and Peñarol in Uruguay. On 2 July 2014, Spada returned to his homeland with Almirante Brown of Primera B Metropolitana. Three appearances followed across the 2014 campaign, with his senior debut coming against Deportivo Merlo. January 2015 saw Spada join fellow third tier team Tristán Suárez. After appearing seven times for the Greater Buenos Aires outfit, Spada departed to Deportivo Español on 26 January 2016. He made his bow in March versus San Telmo, with just two further appearances following. Spada spent part of 2016–17 in Italy's Serie D with Abano.

Having featured in three matches in Italian football, Spada agreed a move back to Deportivo Español in Argentina in August 2017. He'd participate in ten fixtures in the next two seasons, which culminated with relegation to Primera C Metropolitana in 2018–19.

== Career statistics ==
As of 30 May 2019.

Appearances and goals by club, season and competition
Club	Season	League			Cup		League Cup		Continental		Other		Total	
Club	Season	Division	Apps	Goals	Apps	Goals	Apps	Goals	Apps	Goals	Apps	Goals	Apps	Goals
Almirante Brown	2014	Primera B Metropolitana	3	0	0	0	—		—		0	0	3	0
Tristán Suárez	2015	Primera B Metropolitana	7	0	0	0	—		—		0	0	7	0
Deportivo Español	2016	Primera B Metropolitana	3	0	0	0	—		—		0	0	3	0
Abano	2016–17	Serie D	3	0	0	0	—		—		0	0	3	0
Deportivo Español	2017–18	Primera B Metropolitana	6	0	0	0	—		—		0	0	6	0
Deportivo Español	2018–19	Primera B Metropolitana	4	0	0	0	—		—		0	0	4	0
Deportivo Español	Total		10	0	0	0	—		—		0	0	10	0
Career total			26	0	0	0	—		—		0	0	26	0
