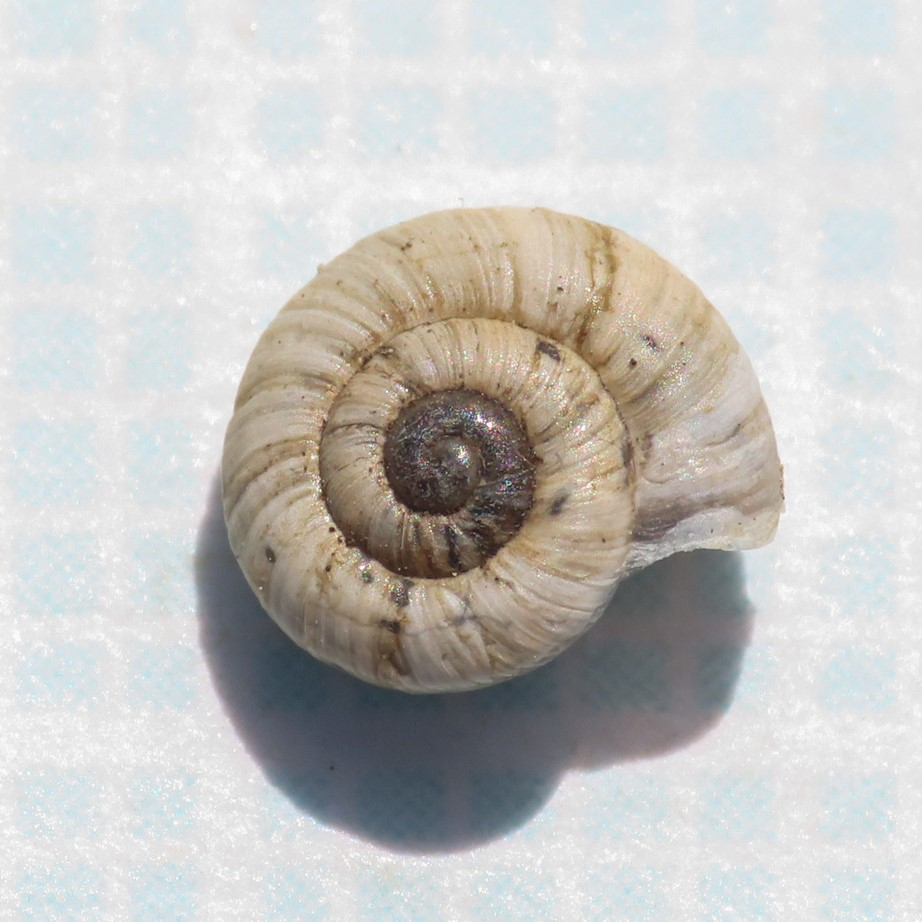

Conservation status
- Vulnerable (IUCN 3.1)

Scientific classification
- Kingdom: Animalia
- Phylum: Mollusca
- Class: Gastropoda
- Order: Stylommatophora
- Family: Geomitridae
- Genus: Xerogyra
- Species: X. fiorii

Binomial name
- Xerogyra fiorii (Alzona & Alzona Bisacchi, 1938)
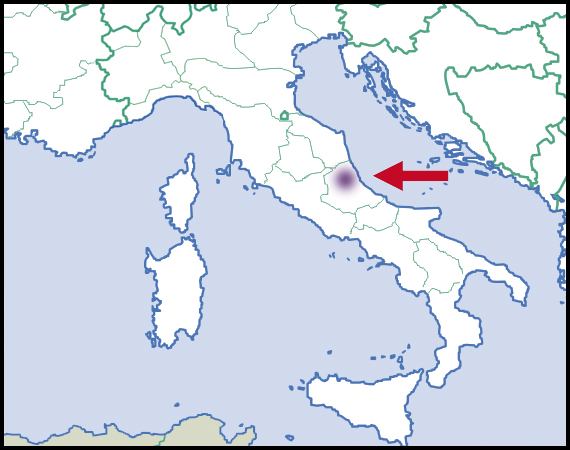

Synonyms
- Candidula fiorii (Alzona & Alzona Bisacchi, 1938) (invalid combination); Helicella (Candidula) fiorii Alzona & Alzona Bisacchi, 1938 (original combination)

= Xerogyra fiorii =

Species of snail

Xerogyra fiorii is a species of air-breathing land snail, a terrestrial pulmonate gastropod mollusk in the family Geomitridae, the hairy snails and their allies.

== Distribution ==
This species is endemic to Italy.
