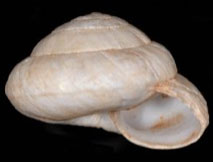
- Apertural view of the shell of Orexana ultima

Scientific classification
- Kingdom: Animalia
- Phylum: Mollusca
- Class: Gastropoda
- Order: Stylommatophora
- Family: Geomitridae
- Genus: Orexana; Chueca et al., 2018

= Orexana =

Genus of snail

Orexana is a genus of small, air-breathing land snails, terrestrial pulmonate gastropod mollusks in the family Geomitridae.

It is distributed along west coast of Morocco and Canary Islands.

== Species ==
Species within the genus Orexana include:

- Orexana ultima (Mousson, 1872)
