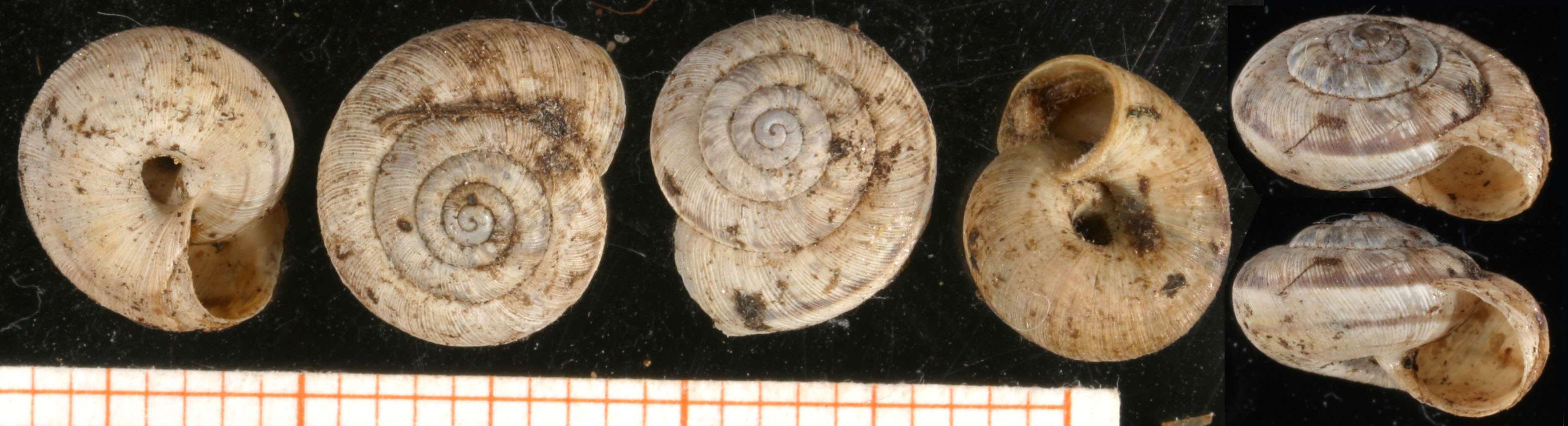
- Shell of Backeljaia gigaxii

Scientific classification
- Domain: Eukaryota
- Kingdom: Animalia
- Phylum: Mollusca
- Class: Gastropoda
- Order: Stylommatophora
- Infraorder: Helicoidei
- Superfamily: Helicoidea
- Family: Geomitridae
- Genus: Backeljaia; Chueca, Gómez-Moliner, Madeira & Pfenninger, 2018

Type species
- Helix caperata var. gigaxii L. Pfeiffer, 1847

= Backeljaia =

Genus of gastropods

Backeljaia is a genus of small to medium-sized, air-breathing land snails, terrestrial pulmonate gastropod mollusks in the family Geomitridae, the hairy snails and their allies.

== Species ==
Species within the genus Backeljaia include:

- Backeljaia camporroblensis (Fez, 1944)
- Backeljaia corbellai (Martínez-Ortí, 2011)
- Backeljaia gigaxii (L. Pfeiffer, 1847)
- Backeljaia najerensis (Ortiz de Zárate y López, 1950)
