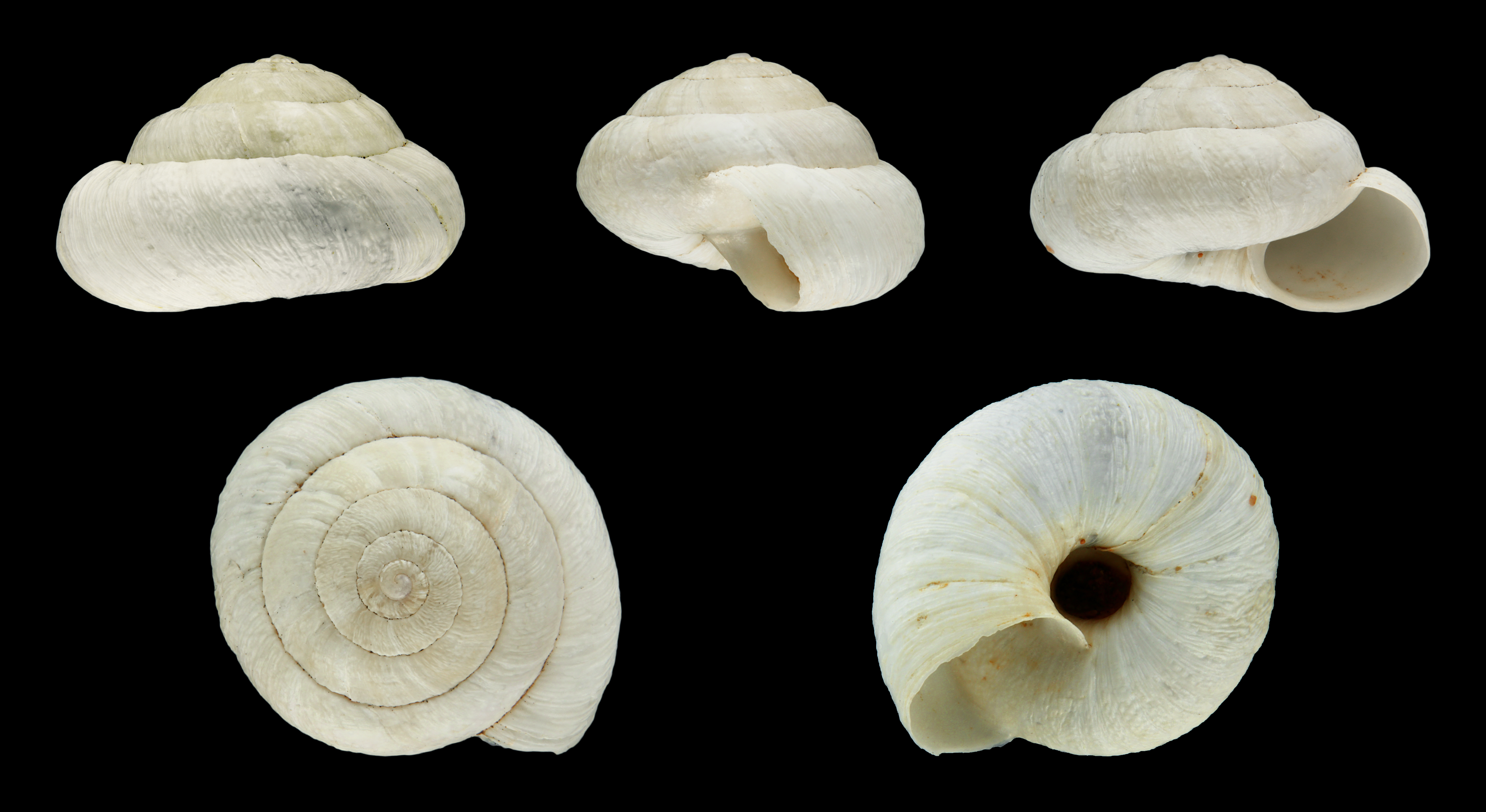

Conservation status
- Near Threatened (IUCN 3.1)

Scientific classification
- Kingdom: Animalia
- Phylum: Mollusca
- Class: Gastropoda
- Order: Stylommatophora
- Family: Geomitridae
- Genus: Orexana
- Species: O. ultima

Binomial name
- Orexana ultima (Mousson, 1872)

Synonyms
- Candidula ultima (Mousson, 1872) (invalid combination)

= Orexana ultima =

Species of mollusc

Orexana ultima is a species of air-breathing land snail, a terrestrial pulmonate gastropod mollusk in the family Geomitridae, the hairy snails and their allies.

The species is endemic to Fuerteventura island (Canary Islands).

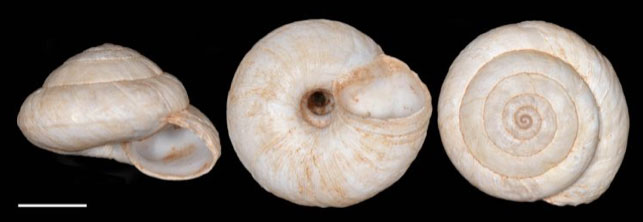
Orexana ultima Lomo del Aceituno, Fuerteventura (Las Palmas). Scale bar 0.5 cm.
