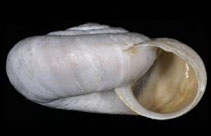
- Apertural view of the shell of Xerogyra spadae

Conservation status
- Vulnerable (IUCN 3.1)

Scientific classification
- Kingdom: Animalia
- Phylum: Mollusca
- Class: Gastropoda
- Order: Stylommatophora
- Family: Geomitridae
- Genus: Xerogyra
- Species: X. spadae

Binomial name
- Xerogyra spadae (Calcara, 1845)

Synonyms
- Candidula spadae (Calcara, 1845); Helix bathyomphala L. Pfeiffer, 1848 (junior synonym); Helix destituta L. Pfeiffer, 1853 (junior synonym); Helix spadae Calcara, 1845

= Xerogyra spadae =

Species of air-breathing land snail

Xerogyra spadae is a species of air-breathing land snail, a terrestrial pulmonate gastropod mollusk in the family Geomitridae.

The specific name spadae, "Spada's", Pietro Calcara commemorated Giovanni Jacopo Spada (1680–1774), an Italian naturalist and pioneering geologist of Verona.

== Distribution ==
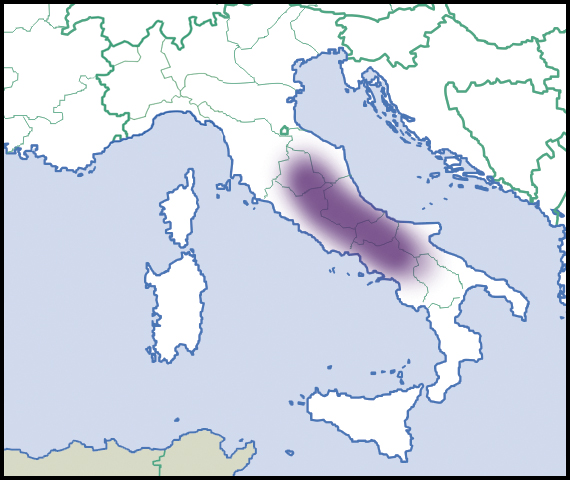
Distribution

Candidula spadae is native to Central Italy. The species in sparsely distributed. It is found in the central Apennines. However, the IUCN asserts that the species is also found in extension to Gargano. It is found in the Sibillini Mountains, including Monte Vettore, and then southward to the Monti Reatini, the Gran Sasso d'Italia, and the Monti della Meta.

== Description ==
The shell of Xerogyra spadae is pale white in color. Often, there are narrow light brownish color bands on the shell. The shell is almost smooth.

The whorls are, to some extent, convex in shape. The number of whorls range between 5.5 and 6. The last two whorls increase more rapidly. The last whorl is weakly angulated. It does not descend near the main opening of the shell, the aperture. The aperture is clearly visible and large. The color inside the aperture is white or light yellowish. There is a lip inside the aperture which is white in color.

The umbilicus is initially narrow, but at the last whorl it increases to one-fourth of the shell diameter.

The width of the shell is 10–16 mm. The height of the shell is 6.5–8.5 mm.

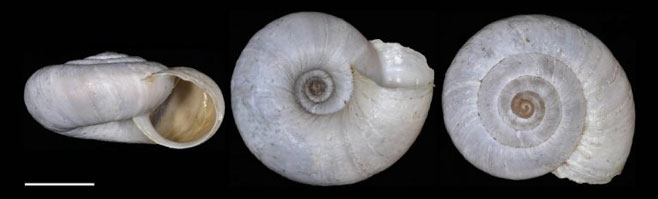
Xeogyra spadae Gran Sasso, Campo Pericoli. L'Aquila (Italy). Scale bar 0.5 cm.

== Habitat ==
Xerogyra spadae is a terrestrial species. It lives on pebbly grassland in the alpine tundra and subalpine zone up to the summit region.

== Population ==
According to the IUCN, the size of the population, despite being not properly known, is showing a decreasing trend. The population declined remarkably in the decades 1990s and 2000s. This population decline was caused by an overall dryness in Central Italy's climate.

== Interaction with humans and conservation status ==
Xerogyra spadae faces risk from the tourism industry and grazing activity. Activities associated with tourism, such as skiing, mountain biking, hiking, as well as rock climbing and mountaineering result in degradation of this snail's habitat quality. With the intensity of land-use in the Apennines described by the IUCN as "stable or even increasing", grazing activity such as pasturing also results in change of the natural vegetation with adverse effects.
