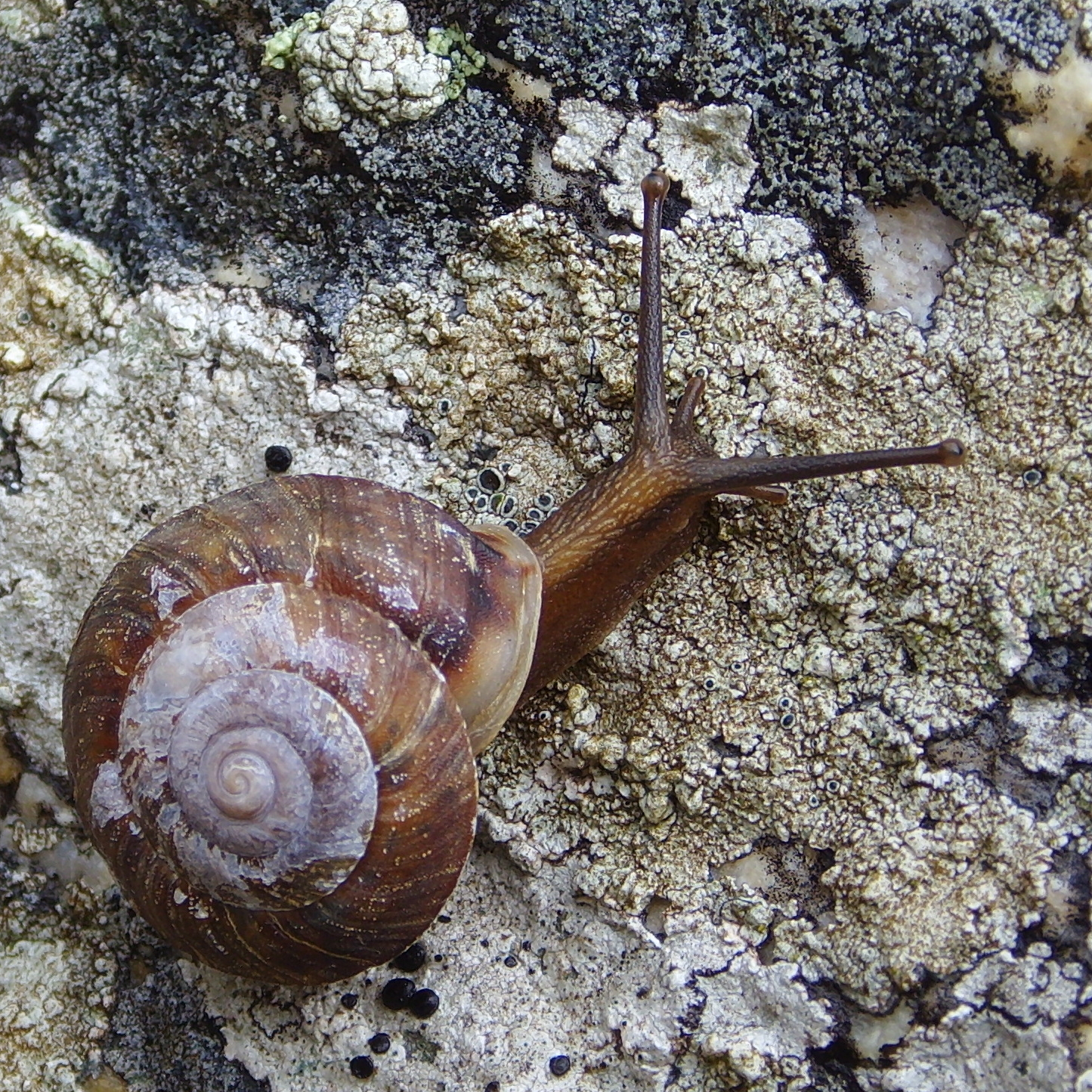
- A live individual of Helicigona lapicida from northwestern France

Conservation status
- Least Concern (IUCN 3.1)

Scientific classification
- Kingdom: Animalia
- Phylum: Mollusca
- Class: Gastropoda
- Order: Stylommatophora
- Family: Helicidae
- Genus: Helicigona
- Species: H. lapicida

Binomial name
- Helicigona lapicida (Linnaeus, 1758)

Synonyms
- Helix lapicida Linnaeus, 1758 (original combination)

= Helicigona lapicida =

Species of gastropod

Helicigona lapicida is a species of medium-sized, air-breathing land snail, a terrestrial pulmonate gastropod mollusk in the family Helicidae, the typical snails.

Subspecies

- Helicigona lapicida andorrica (Bourguignat, 1876)
- Helicigona lapicida lapicida (Linnaeus, 1758)

== Anatomy ==
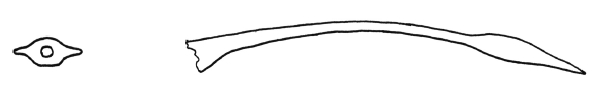
Love dart of Helicigona lapicida

This species of snail makes and uses love darts during mating.

== Distribution ==
This species is native to Europe, especially Central Europe.

== Ecology ==
Helicigona lapicida is known to feed selectively on certain lichens inhabiting rocky substrates, including the crustose lichen species Verrucaria nigrescens.

== Shell description ==
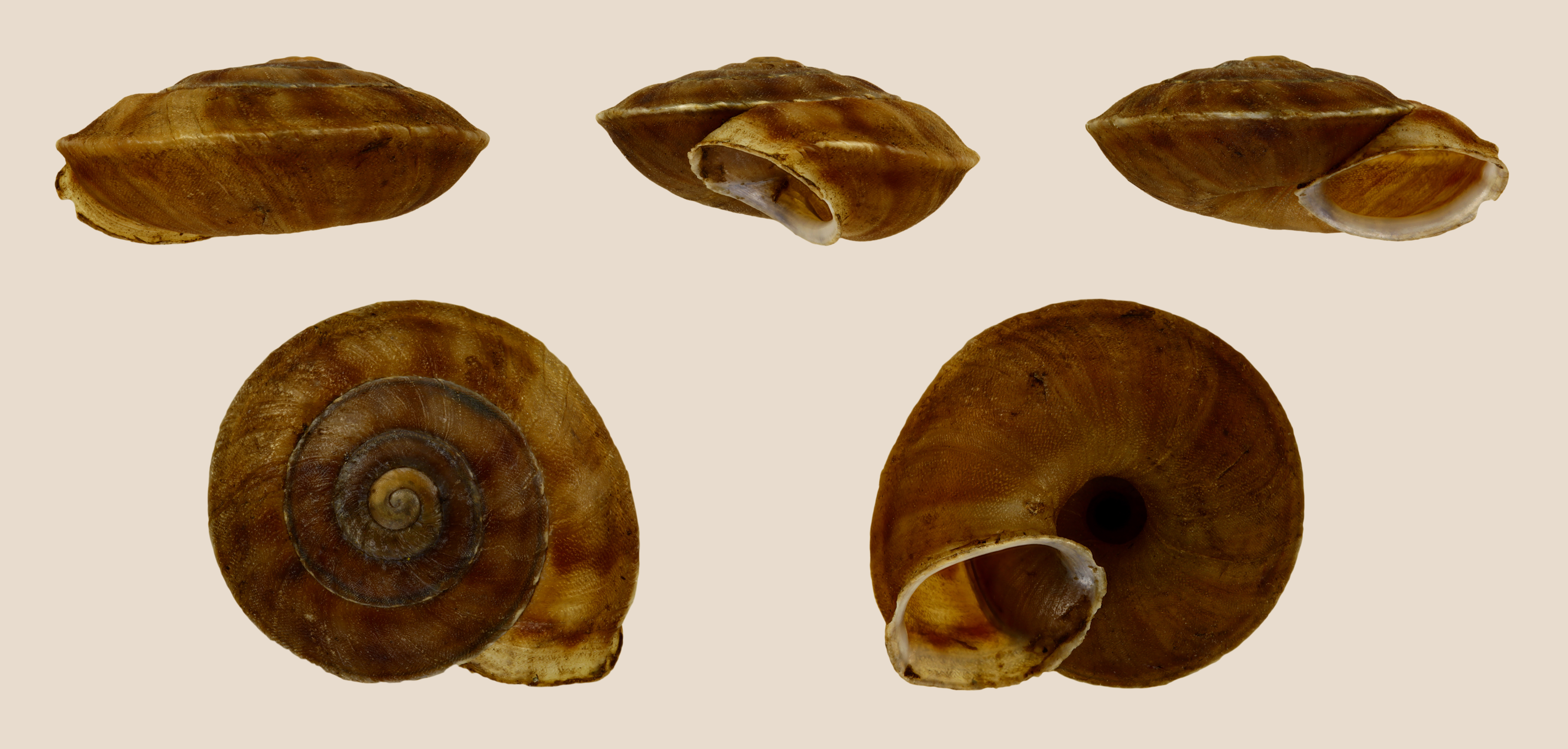
Five views of a shell of Helicigona lapicida lapicida

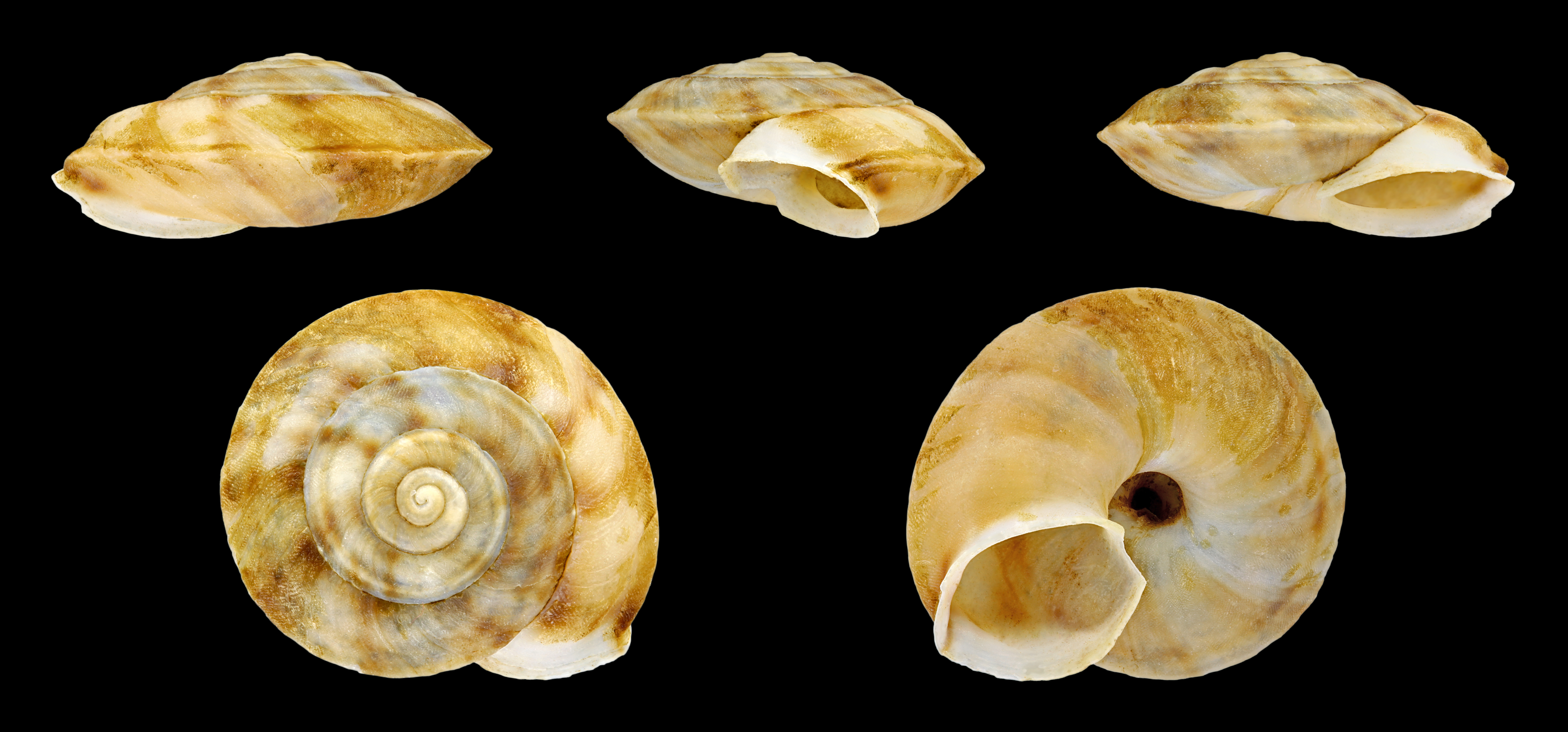
Five views of a shell of Helicigona lapicida andorrica

The shell of this species is approximately 20 mm in maximum dimension. The periphery of the shell is sharply keeled. There is a wide umbilicus. The peristome around the aperture is white and strongly reflected and lipped. The shell color is grey-brown with some red brown patches.
