= Candidula codia =

Conservation status
- Least Concern (IUCN 3.1)

Scientific classification
- Domain: Eukaryota
- Kingdom: Animalia
- Phylum: Mollusca
- Class: Gastropoda
- Order: Stylommatophora
- Family: Geomitridae
- Genus: Candidula
- Species: C. codia

Binomial name
- Candidula codia (Bourguignat, 1859)

Synonyms
- Helix codia Bourguignat, 1860 (original name); Helix codopsis Servain, 1880 (junior synonym)

Species of gastropod

Candidula codia is a species of air-breathing land snail, a terrestrial pulmonate gastropod mollusk in the family Geomitridae, the hairy snails and their allies.

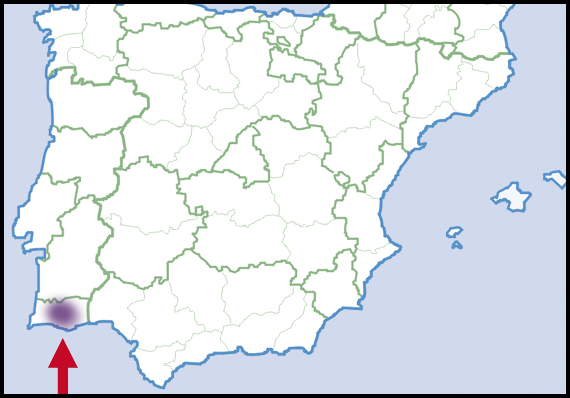
Distribution
