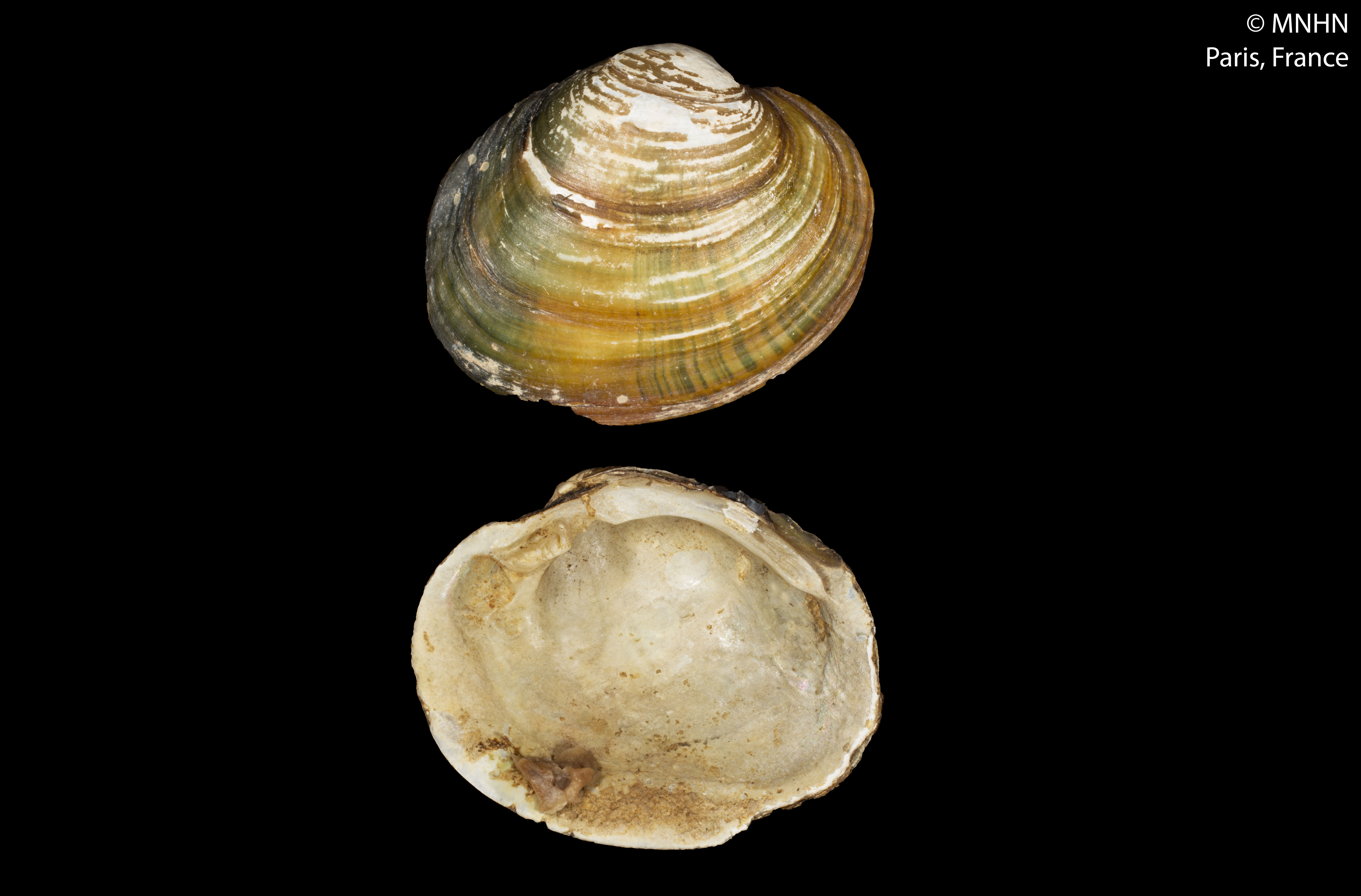
- Dried shell (syntype at MNHN, Paris)

Conservation status
- Endangered (IUCN 3.1)

Scientific classification
- Kingdom: Animalia
- Phylum: Mollusca
- Class: Bivalvia
- Order: Unionida
- Superfamily: Unionoidea
- Family: Unionidae
- Genus: Potomida
- Species: P. littoralis

Binomial name
- Potomida littoralis (Cuvier, 1798)

Synonyms
- Mysca (Potomida) corrugata Swainson, 1840 (junior synonym); Potomida (Potomida) litoralis [sic]; Potomida littoralis fellmanni (Deshayes, 1848); Potomida littoralis umbonata (Rossmässler, 1844); Rhombunio asananus Pallary, 1928 (junior synonym); Unio calderoni Kobelt, 1888 (junior synonym); Unio fellmanni Deshayes, 1848; Unio hispalensis Kobelt, 1888 (junior synonym); Unio incurvus I. Lea, 1831; Unio ksibianus Mousson, 1873 (junior synonym); Unio littoralis Cuvier, 1798 (original combination); Unio littoralis var. bucheti Pallary, 1899 (original combination); † Unio littoralis var. pequignoti Pallary, 1901; Unio littoralis var. umbonatus Rossmässler, 1844; Unio marteli Pallary, 1918 (original combination); Unio subtetragonus Michaud, 1831 (a junior synonym); Unio unduliferus Küster, 1861 (junior synonym)

= Potomida littoralis =

Species of bivalve

Potomida littoralis is a species of freshwater bivalve belonging to the family Unionidae. It is sometimes known as black river mussel.

== Distribution and habitat ==
The species is found in southwestern Europe (France, Spain and Portugal) and northwestern Africa (Morocco, Algeria and Tunisia). Potomida further east are now assigned to other species (P. acarnanica and P. semirugata).

Potomida littoralis typically occurs in the middle to lower river sections, but can occasionally be found in the upper parts of the calcium-rich rivers.

== Reproduction ==
In the Iberian Peninsula, gravid females are observed from March through October. Its known hosts are all cyprinids.

== Conservation ==
According to the International Union for Conservation of Nature, this species is endangered and in decline. Canalization of river channels, water pollution, and dam construction are major threats. Water extraction is harming populations in much of its range except in France. The distribution of P. littoralis in the Iberian peninsula and in France is highly fragmented.
