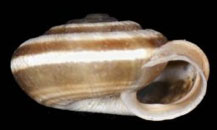
- Apertural view of the shell of Zarateana arganica

Scientific classification
- Kingdom: Animalia
- Phylum: Mollusca
- Class: Gastropoda
- Order: Stylommatophora
- Family: Geomitridae
- Genus: Zarateana; Chueca et al., 2018

Type species
- Zarateana arganica (Servain, 1880)

Diversity
- 2 species

= Zarateana =

Genus of gastropods

Zarateana is a genus of small, air-breathing land snails, terrestrial pulmonate gastropod mollusks in the family Geomitridae, the hairy snails and their allies.

The genus is endemic to the Iberian Peninsula.

== Species ==
The genus contains two species:

- Zarateana arganica (Servain, 1880) type species
- Zarateana rocandioi (Ortiz de Zárate y López, 1950)
