= Marianna Paulucci =

Italian malacologist

Marianna Panciatichi Ximenes d’Aragona Paulucci
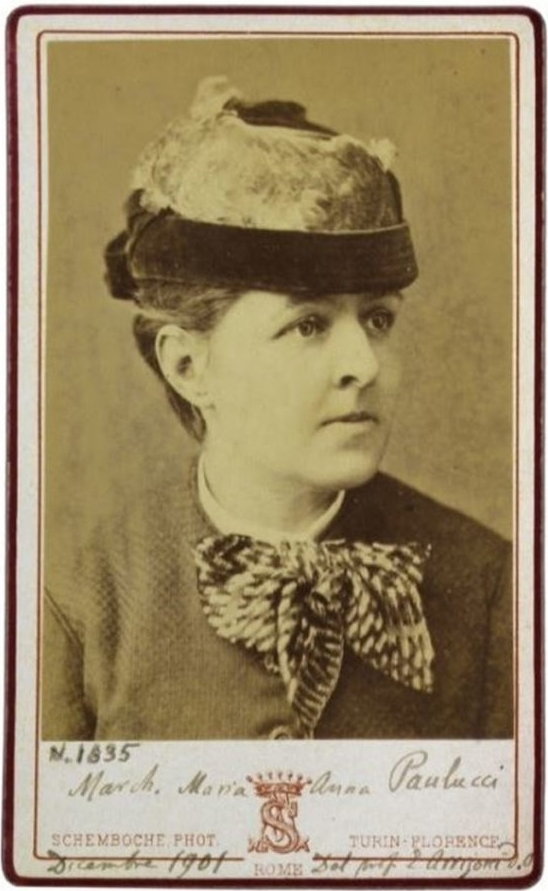
- c. 1901
- Born: 3 February 1835; Florence, Grand Duchy of Tuscany
- Died: 7 December 1919 (aged 84); Florence, Italy
- Spouse: Alessandro Anafesto Paulucci (m. 1853)
- Scientific career
- Fields: Malacology, ornithology

Marquise Marianna Panciatichi Ximenes d’Aragona Paulucci (3 February 1835 – 7 December 1919) was an Italian noblewoman and naturalist. She contributed to malacology, botany and ornithology. A specialist in non-marine molluscs, she published 32 malacological works, describing two genera and 159 species, and is commemorated in around 40 scientific names of organisms: primarily molluscs, as well as the fossil shark Scyllium pauluccii and the bird subspecies Sylvia atricapilla pauluccii.

== Life and work ==
Ximenes was born in Florence into a noble family: the daughter of Ferdinando Panciatichi Ximenes d'Aragona and Giulia De Saint Seigne. On her mother's side Ferdinando Panciatichi was involved in introducing various plants into Italy including the first redwood. She studied at Ripoli College. In 1853 she married Marquis Alessandro Anafesto Paulucci, a botanist and son of General Filippo Paulucci. In 1866 she published her first scientific work on the Pliocene fossil gastropod Murex veranyi collected in Val d'Elsa. She collaborated extensively with Italian naturalists including those from Parma who were known to the family of her husband. The ornithologist Ettore Arrigoni degli Oddi was the husband of her niece. She was able to work amid the acrimonious debate among her fellow malacologists Carlo de Stefani and Napoleone Pini. She opposed the excessive splitting of Jules-René Bourguignat and was interested in ideas on evolution. She described about seventy new species of molluscs and nearly forty mollusc taxa are named in her honour.

In 1887, after her husband's death, and ten years after her father died, the Marquise had to abandon her studies as well as her collections so she could devote her energies almost entirely to the administration of her significant family affairs. To do so, she donated her collections of non-marine molluscs (dating back to 1862, when she was just 27 years old) to the Natural History Museum at the University of Florence and her bird collection of about 1,200 specimens ones to the Municipality of San Gimignano, Italy. Their family villa Sammezzano was made with artistic styles from Alhambra of Granada, the Alcazar of Seville, the Taj Mahal, Persian and Egyptian architecture. The building was begun by Paulucci's father and completed by her. The villa is listed in the Italian Code of Cultural Heritage and Landscapes (Codice dei beni culturali e del paesaggio) and the location was used in several movies sets including Il racconto dei racconti in 2015.

Her herbarium collection of 4,153 specimens belonging to 1,492 different species was donated to the Galileo Galilei Technical Institute. She died on 7 December 1919 in her villa in Regello.

== Selected publications ==
Paulucci published nearly 40 works of which 32 dealt with malacology and the remainder with ornithology and plants. A selection of her works include:

- Paulucci, M. (1878). Matériaux pour servir à l'étude de la faune malacologique terrestre et fluviatile de l'Italie et de ses îles.
- Paulucci, M. (1879). Escursione scientifica nella Calabria 1877-78: fauna malacologica; specie terrestri e fluviatili. F. lli Bocca.
- Paulucci, M. (1879). Fauna malacologia: specie terrestri e fluviatili enumerate e descritte da M. Paulucci. Con tavole illustrative. Coi tipi dell'Arte della stampa.
- Paulucci, M. P. (1881). Descrizione di una nuova specie del genere'Acme'.
- Paulucci, M. (1882). Note malacologiche sulla fauna terrestre e fluviale dell'isola di Sardegna. Tip. dell'ancora de G. Bargellini.
- Paulucci, M. (1886). Gli albero lungo le pubbliche strade. Bullettino della R. Società Toscana di Orticultura, 1(3), 69–71.

== See also ==
- Timeline of women in science
