= Xeroplexa carrapateirensis =

Scientific classification
- Kingdom: Animalia
- Phylum: Mollusca
- Class: Gastropoda
- Order: Stylommatophora
- Family: Geomitridae
- Genus: Xeroplexa
- Species: X. carrapateirensis

Binomial name
- Xeroplexa carrapateirensis (Holyoak & Holyoak, 2014)

Synonyms
- Candidula carrapateirensis Holyoak & Holyoak, 2014

Species of gastropod

Xeroplexa carrapateirensis is a species of air-breathing land snail, a terrestrial pulmonate gastropod mollusk in the family Geomitridae. The species epithet carrapateirensis is an adjective derived from the type locality near Carrapateira.

== Description ==
Strongly convex to pyramidal above, rounded below, with 4.7–5.2 whorls. Whorls rounded, flattened above near the moderately deep sutures. Umbilicus narrow to very narrow, deep, ± symmetrical, partly overlapped by reflected peristome. Mouth almost round, except where interrupted by penultimate whorl, the last part of body whorl expanding markedly, descending slightly near mouth. Shell often rather thin and somewhat translucent, slightly glossy above, more strongly glossy below. Ground colour usually pale brown above, whitish below; upperside commonly with one strong band of brown to blackish-brown towards periphery and one or more diffuse interrupted bands above it, the crests of ribs whitish, but very variable; underside commonly with several thin translucent bands. Transverse ribs on upperside of later whorls typically strong but irregular and often discontinuous, much weaker on underside. Spiral lines obvious on underside of most shells.
