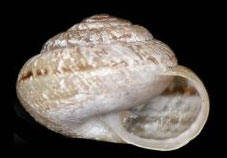
- Apertural view of the shell of Xeroplexa ponsulensis

Scientific classification
- Kingdom: Animalia
- Phylum: Mollusca
- Class: Gastropoda
- Order: Stylommatophora
- Family: Geomitridae
- Genus: Xeroplexa
- Species: X. ponsulensis

Binomial name
- Xeroplexa ponsulensis (Holyoak & Holyoak, 2014)

Synonyms
- Candidula ponsulensis (Holyoak & Holyoak, 2014)

= Xeroplexa ponsulensis =

Species of gastropod

Xeroplexa ponsulensis is a species of air-breathing land snail, a terrestrial pulmonate gastropod mollusk in the family Geomitridae.

The species epithet ponsulensis is an adjective derived from the type locality near the Rio Pônsul.

== Description ==
Strongly convex to convex above, flattened below, with 5.2–5.8 whorls. Whorls rounded, sometimes with slight peripheral keel (the keel prominent in subadults); sutures shallow on most of spire, often deeper above last half of body whorl. Umbilicus rather narrow, symmetrical, deep, partly overlapped by reflected peristome, exposing upper whorls in oblique view. Mouth broadly oval, except where interrupted by penultimate whorl; last half of body whorl expanding and often descending markedly below penultimate whorl, sometimes also with downturn just behind edge of mouth. Mouth edge thin, reflected only near umbilicus. Shell rather thin, often translucent; weakly glossy above, more strongly glossy beneath. Ground colour on upperside pale to light brown, often with orange or pinkish tinge, paler on underside; the upperside usually with interrupted band of red-brown to dark brown blotches near periphery, remainder variably blotched or suffused brown and light buff, the rib crests often pale; underside almost unmarked to weakly marked with thin brown bands (often interrupted), thin translucent bands, or buff spots. Transverse ribs mainly rather weak, especially on underside of shell where they are sometimes absent or weakly indicated. Spiral lines strong on underside of shell.

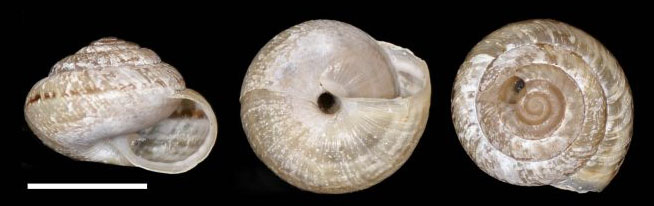
Xeroplexa ponsulensis Pias. Zamora (Spain). Scale bar 0.5 cm.

== Distribution ==
Endemic to western Iberian Peninsula. In eastern Portugal, is known from localities in dry regions on acidic rocks in south Beira Alta, Beira Baixa and east of Baixo Alentejo.
