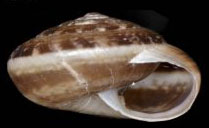
- Apertural view of the shell of Xeroplexa arrabidensis

Scientific classification
- Kingdom: Animalia
- Phylum: Mollusca
- Class: Gastropoda
- Order: Stylommatophora
- Family: Geomitridae
- Genus: Xeroplexa
- Species: X. arrabidensis

Binomial name
- Xeroplexa arrabidensis (Holyoak & Holyoak, 2014)

Synonyms
- Candidula arrabidensis (Holyoak & Holyoak, 2014)

= Xeroplexa arrabidensis =

Species of gastropod

Xeroplexa arrabidensis is a species of air-breathing land snail, a terrestrial pulmonate gastropod mollusk in the family Geomitridae.

The species epithet arrabidensis is an adjective derived from the type locality Serra da Arrábida.

== Description ==
Shape convex to low-convex above, flattened below. Whorls rounded, with shallow to very shallow sutures. Umbilicus moderately wide, symmetrical, deep, exposing upper whorls, usually slightly overlapped by reflected peristome. Mouth broadly oval, except where interrupted by penultimate whorl; last part of body whorl expanding, descending near mouth. Shell moderately thick, slightly translucent; surface glossy above and often strongly glossy below. Ground-colour pale brown throughout, or whitish beneath; upperside nearly always with brown to blackish-brown markings that are very variable in extent, but form sharply defined bands on only a minority of shells, consisting instead of interrupted bands or rows of irregular blotches, often with whitish rib crests; underside also with very variable dark markings, often in several thin interrupted bands; underside some- times mainly dark brown. Transverse ribs on upperside of shell ± regular on higher whorls of spire, becoming weak or partly absent on body whorl; on underside generally weaker.

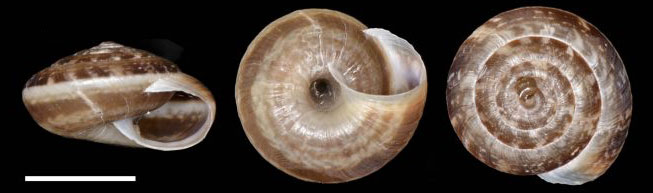
Xeroplexa arrabidensis Serra da Arrábida. Setúbal (Portugal). Scale bar 0.5 cm.

== Distribution ==
Endemic to Portugal, where mainly restricted to rocky limestone habitats in Estremadura (Sétubal District) extending from Serra da Arrábida westwards to near Cabo Espichel.
