= Xeroplexa belemensis =

Conservation status
- Least Concern (IUCN 3.1)

Scientific classification
- Kingdom: Animalia
- Phylum: Mollusca
- Class: Gastropoda
- Order: Stylommatophora
- Family: Geomitridae
- Genus: Xeroplexa
- Species: X. belemensis

Binomial name
- Xeroplexa belemensis (Servain, 1880)

Synonyms
- Candidula belemensis (Servain, 1880); Helix absidata Locard, 1899 (junior synonym); Helix belemensis Servain, 1880 (original combination)

Species of gastropod

Xeroplexa belemensis is a species of air-breathing land snail, a terrestrial pulmonate gastropod mollusk in the family Geomitridae.

== Distribution ==
This species occurs in Portugal.

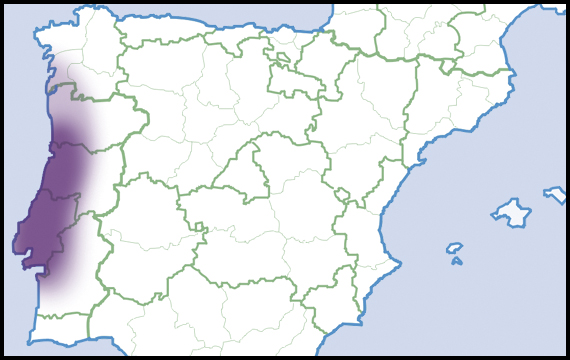
Distribution
