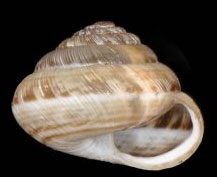
- Apertural view of the shell of Xeroplexa olisippensis

Conservation status
- Least Concern (IUCN 3.1)

Scientific classification
- Kingdom: Animalia
- Phylum: Mollusca
- Class: Gastropoda
- Order: Stylommatophora
- Family: Geomitridae
- Genus: Xeroplexa
- Species: X. olisippensis

Binomial name
- Xeroplexa olisippensis (Servain, 1880)

Synonyms
- Candidula olisippensis (Servain, 1880); Helix callisona Locard, 1899 (junior synonym); Helix defectiva Locard, 1899 ·; Helix micida Locard, 1899 (junior synonym); Helix ofellata Locard, 1899 (junior synonym); Helix olisippensis Servain, 1880 (original combination); Helix portionalis Locard, 1899 (junior synonym); Helix protumida Locard, 1899 (junior synonym); Helix putilla Locard, 1899 (junior synonym)

= Xeroplexa olisippensis =

Species of gastropod

Xeroplexa olisippensis is a species of air-breathing land snail endemic to Portugal, a terrestrial pulmonate gastropod mollusk in the family Geomitridae.

== Description ==
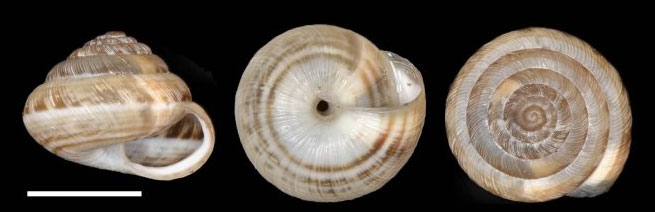
Xeroplexa olisippensis Boliqueime. Faro (Portugal). Scale bar 0.5 cm.

== Distribution and habitat ==
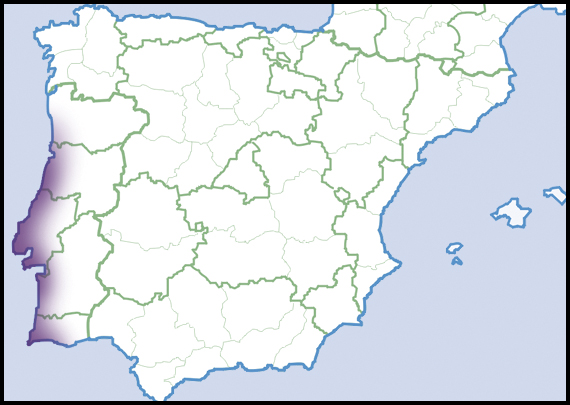
Distribution

Xeroplexa olisippensis has its distribution in Portugal, widely spread through the western part of the country, from Porto to Faro. It lives in ruderal habitats, open forest, grassland, edges of rivers even in dunes under the stones or on the stems of vegetation.
