= Tuosist =

Parish and village in County Kerry, Ireland

Tuosist Tuath Ó Siosta
- Parish
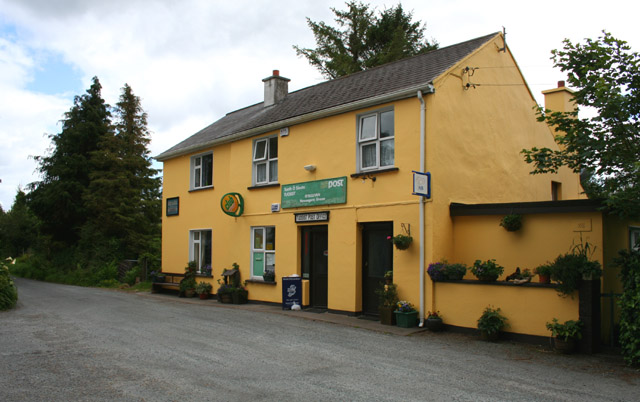
- Tuosist Post Office

- Location in Ireland
- Coordinates: 51°48′15″N 9°45′21″W
- Country: Ireland
- Province: Munster
- County: County Kerry
- Time zone: UTC+0 (WET)
  - Summer (DST): UTC-1 (IST (WEST))
- Website: www.tuosist.com Tuosist on Facebook

Tuosist (Irish: Tuath Ó Siosta, meaning 'territory of O'Siosta') is a small village and civil parish in the far south of County Kerry, Ireland. It shares the Béara Peninsula with the neighbouring parishes of County Cork, and the Caha Mountains form the county border. The nearest town is Kenmare, 15 km to the north-east. The parish is part of the barony of Glanrought and is divided into three electoral divisions: Dawros, Ardea and Glenmore.

Local attractions include the Uragh Stone Circle, Uragh Wood, Cloonee and Inchiquin Loughs, the Healy Pass, Glenmore Lake, Derreen Garden, and Gleninchaquin Park.

The main local sport is Gaelic football, organised by Tuosist GAA club. Phil O'Sullivan from Tuosist captained Kerry GAA to an All-Ireland Senior Football Championship title in 1924.

Saint Kilian from County Cavan is the patron saint of the parish. He is believed to have departed from Kilmacillogue harbour in Tuosist on his mission to Würzburg, Germany. An annual pattern takes places on his feast-day, every 8 July.

The townland of Ardea, in the centre of the parish, was the location of Ardea Castle, a stronghold of Donal Cam O'Sullivan Beare.
