= Uragh Wood =

Coordinates: 51°48′16″N 9°41′19″W

- Tearmann Dúlra Choill na hIúraí (Irish)
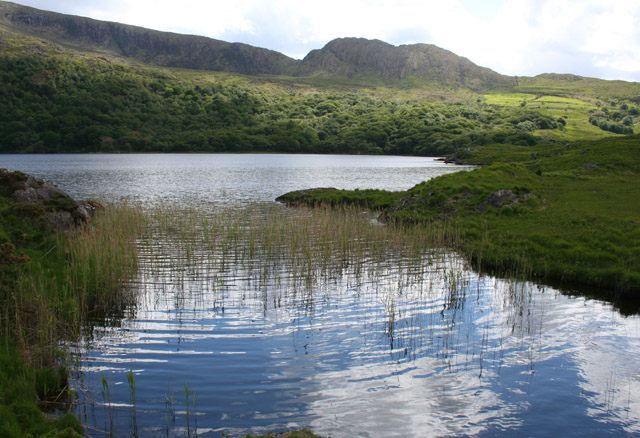
- Uragh Wood seen from Inchiquin Lough
- Interactive map of Uragh Wood
- Location: County Kerry, Ireland
- Area: 87 ha (210 acres)
- Established: 1982
- Governing body: National Parks and Wildlife Service
- Website: www.npws.ie/nature-reserves/kerry/uragh-wood-nature-reserve

Uragh Wood (Irish: Tearmann Dúlra Choill na hIúraí) is a wood in Tuosist, County Kerry, Ireland, which was designated a nature reserve in 1982. The wood is largely sessile oak and covers 87 ha. It is owned by the state. There is no public access.

Since Ireland's adoption of the European Union's Habitats Directive, the wood has been included within a Special Area of Conservation of 1,154 ha, Cloonee and Inchiquin Loughs, Uragh Wood (Inchiquin being the lake next to the wood).

== Flora and fauna ==
Fauna includes:

- The Kerry slug (listed in annexes II and IV of the Habitats Directive)
- The lesser horseshoe bat (listed in annex II of the Habitats Directive)

The wood is internationally important for its suite of hyper-oceanic woodland bryophytes.

== See also ==
- Uragh Stone Circle
