= Geomalacus anguiformis =

Scientific classification
- Kingdom: Animalia
- Phylum: Mollusca
- Class: Gastropoda
- Order: Stylommatophora
- Family: Arionidae
- Genus: Geomalacus
- Subgenus: Arrudia
- Species: G. anguiformis

Binomial name
- Geomalacus anguiformis (Morelet, 1845)

Synonyms
- Limax anguiformis Morelet, 1845

Species of gastropod

Geomalacus anguiformis is a species of air-breathing land slug, a terrestrial pulmonate gastropod mollusc in the family Arionidae, the round back slugs.

== Distribution ==
This species occurs in south Portugal (Serra de Monchique) and central Spain.

== Description ==
The slug is dark grey with brown hue. It has lighter sides and two light colour bands with dark lower margins running along both sides of the mantle. Mantle is elliptical, extending to tentacles in anterior part. Tentacles are nearly black, thick and not very long. When crawling, the slug has not always a regularly cylindrical shape, there are depressions and dilatations. Sole is light creamy with darker medial zone, with yellowish or greenish hue. Mucus is yellow. Geomalacus anguiformis is 60 mm long (preserved 30 mm).

Shell is elliptical, solid, upper side convex and lower side flat.

The reproductive system is diagnostic feature: Geomalacus anguiformis has atrial diverticulum shorter than spermatheca duct while Kerry slug Geomalacus maculosus has atrial diverticulum longer than spermatheca duct. Geomalacus anguiformis has penis long, vas deferens very thin, spermatheca oval with long duct. Geomalacus anguiformis differs from Geomalacus oliveirae in its atriopenis inserting at the prolongation of the atrial long axis (not laterally).

== Ecology ==
Geomalacus anguiformis was found in olive plantations, under bark.
