= Tetanocera melanostigma =

Scientific classification
- Domain: Eukaryota
- Kingdom: Animalia
- Phylum: Arthropoda
- Class: Insecta
- Order: Diptera
- Family: Sciomyzidae
- Genus: Tetanocera
- Species: T. melanostigma

Binomial name
- Tetanocera melanostigma Steyskal, 1959

Species of fly

Tetanocera melanostigma is a species of marsh fly in the family Sciomyzidae.
