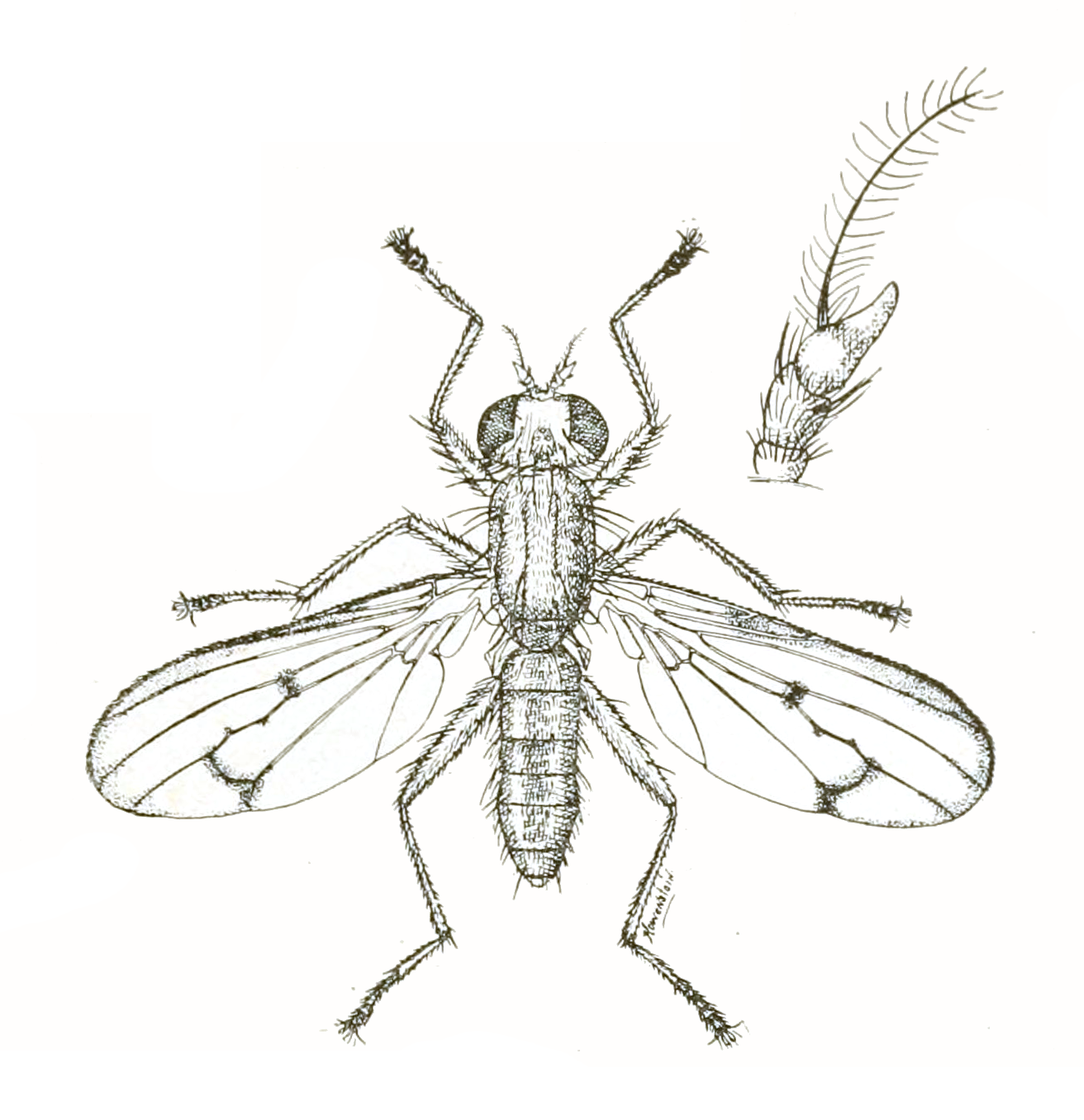

Scientific classification
- Domain: Eukaryota
- Kingdom: Animalia
- Phylum: Arthropoda
- Class: Insecta
- Order: Diptera
- Family: Sciomyzidae
- Genus: Tetanocera
- Species: T. plumosa

Binomial name
- Tetanocera plumosa Loew, 1847

Synonyms
- Tetanocera nanciae Brimley, 1925; Tetanocera plumifera Wulp, 1895

= Tetanocera plumosa =

Species of fly

Tetanocera plumosa is a species of marsh fly in the family Sciomyzidae.
