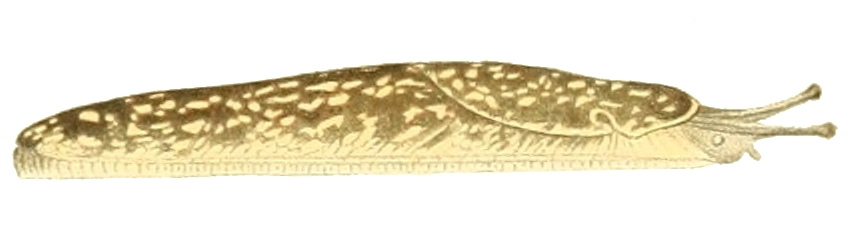
- drawing of Geomalacus maculosus

Scientific classification
- Kingdom: Animalia
- Phylum: Mollusca
- Class: Gastropoda
- Order: Stylommatophora
- Family: Arionidae
- Genus: Geomalacus; Allman, 1843

Subgenera and species
- Geomalacus; Geomalacus maculosus Allman, 1843 - Kerry slug; Arrudia Pollonera, 1890; Geomalacus anguiformis (Morelet, 1845); Geomalacus malagensis Wiktor & Norris, 1991; Geomalacus oliveirae Simroth, 1891

= Geomalacus =

Genus of gastropods

Geomalacus is a genus of large air-breathing land slugs, terrestrial pulmonate gastropod mollusks in the family Arionidae, the roundback slugs.

== Etymology ==
The Ancient Greek word geo (γη) means the Earth. The Greek word malacus (μαλαχὀς) means mollusc.

== Distribution ==
Western Europe

== Species ==
This genus contains the following species:

subgenus Geomalacus

- Geomalacus maculosus Allman, 1843 - Kerry slug

subgenus Arrudia Pollonera, 1890

- Geomalacus anguiformis (Morelet, 1845)
- Geomalacus malagensis Wiktor & Norris, 1991
  known by some as Geomalacus moreleti (Hesse, 1884)
- Geomalacus oliveirae Simroth, 1891

== Description ==
Animal limaciform, subcylindrical, blunt behind, with a but little developed mucous pore; mantle anterior, close to the head, concealing a shell-plate; a distinct locomotive disk; respiratory orifice on the right anterior margin of the mantle; genital orifice behind and below the right eye-peduncle. Shell-plate calcareous, ovate, small and solid. Jaw costulated; lingual dentition as in Arion.

The main diagnostic feature of the reproductive system differing from genera Arion, Letourneuxia and Ariunculus is, that species in the genus Geomalacus has atrium with diverticulum. The free oviduct is short; the retractor muscle is attached to the spermatheca duct; vas deferens and epiphalus are long.
