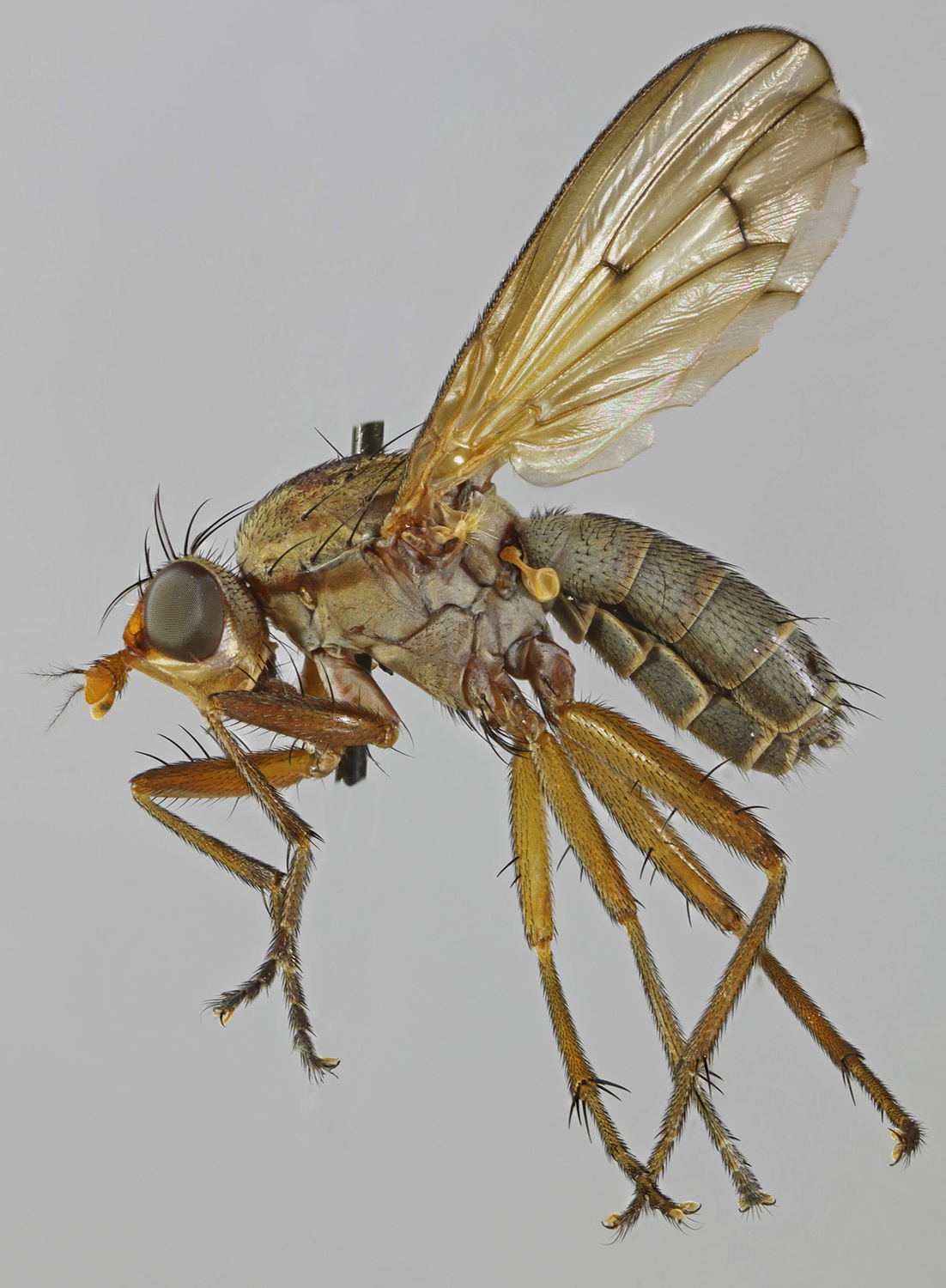
- Tetanocera ferruginea

Scientific classification
- Kingdom: Animalia
- Phylum: Arthropoda
- Class: Insecta
- Order: Diptera
- Family: Sciomyzidae
- Tribe: Tetanocerini
- Genus: Tetanocera; Duméril, 1800

Type species
- Musca elata Fabricius, 1781

Synonyms
- Thais Haliday in Curtis, 1837

= Tetanocera =

Genus of flies

Tetanocera is a genus of marsh flies, insects in the family Sciomyzidae. There are at least 50 described species in Tetanocera.

== Species ==
- T. amurensis Hendel, 1909
- T. andromastos Steyskal, 1963
- T. annae Steyskal, 1938
- T. apicalis (Bigot, 1858)
- T. arnaudi Orth and Fisher, 1982
- T. arrogans Meigen, 1830
- T. bergi Steyskal, 1954
- T. brevisetosa Frey, 1924
- T. chosenica Steyskal, 1951
- T. clara Loew, 1862
- T. claripennis (Robineau-Desvoidy, 1830)
- T. cornuta Walker, 1853
- T. discendens Becker, 1907
- T. elata (Fabricius, 1781)
- T. ferriginea Fallén, 1820
- T. ferruginea Fallén, 1820
- T. freyi Stackelberg, 1963
- T. fuscinervis (Zetterstedt, 1838)
- T. gracilior Stackelberg, 1963
- T. hyalipennis Roser, 1840
- T. ignota Becker, 1907
- T. iowensis Steyskal, 1938
- T. kerteszi Hendel, 1901
- T. lacera Wiedemann, 1830
- T. lapponica Frey, 1924
- T. latifibula Frey, 1924
- T. loewi Steyskal, 1959
- T. marginella (Robineau-Desvoidy, 1830)
- T. maritima (Robineau-Desvoidy, 1830)
- T. melanostigma Steyskal, 1959
- T. mesopora Steyskal, 1959
- T. montana Day, 1881
- T. nigricosta Rondani, 1868
- T. nigrostriata Li, Yang & Gu, 2001
- T. obtusifibula Melander, 1920
- T. ornatifrons Frey, 1924
- T. oxia Steyskal, 1959
- T. phyllophora Melander, 1920
- T. plebeja Loew, 1862
- T. plumosa Loew, 1847
- T. punctifrons Rondani, 1868
- T. robusta Loew, 1847
- T. rotundicornis Loew, 1861
- T. silvatica Meigen, 1830
- T. soror Melander, 1920
- T. spirifera Melander, 1920
- T. spreta Wulp, 1897
- T. stricklandi Steyskal, 1959
- T. valida Loew, 1862
- T. vicina Macquart, 1843
