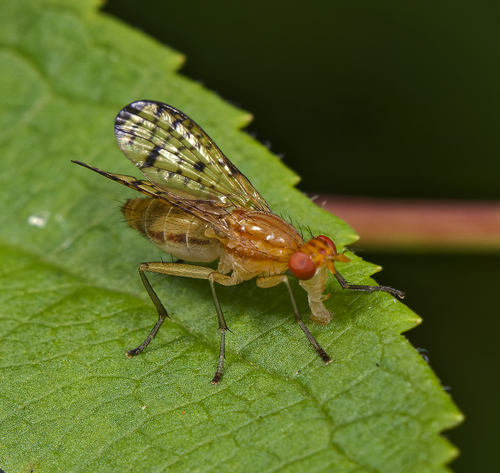
- Tetanocera valida seen in Quebec

Scientific classification
- Domain: Eukaryota
- Kingdom: Animalia
- Phylum: Arthropoda
- Class: Insecta
- Order: Diptera
- Family: Sciomyzidae
- Genus: Tetanocera
- Species: T. valida

Binomial name
- Tetanocera valida Loew, 1862

Synonyms
- Tetanocera reticulata Harris, 1925

= Tetanocera valida =

Species of fly

Tetanocera valida is a species of marsh fly in the family Sciomyzidae.
