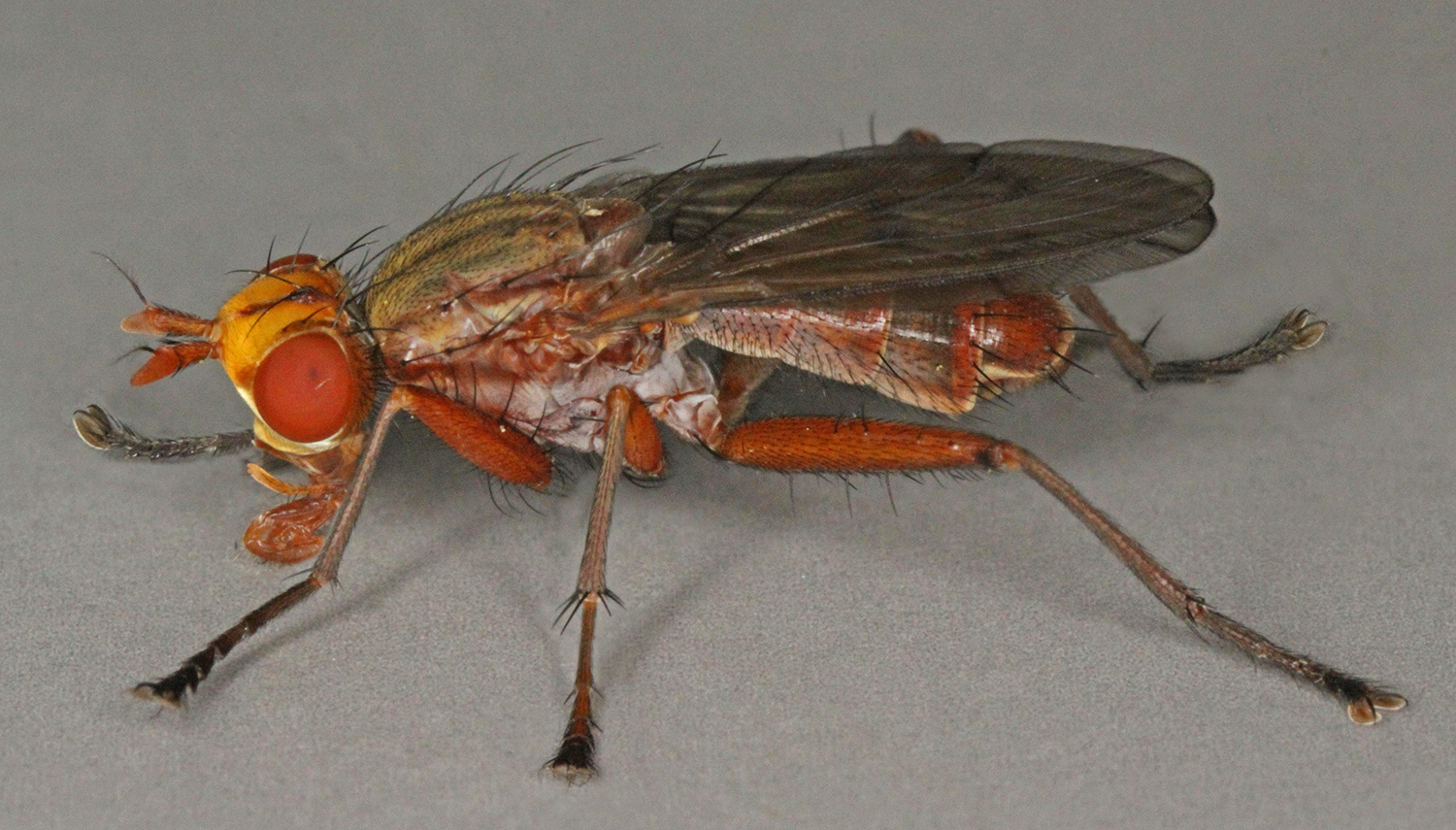
- Tetanocera robusta North Wales

Scientific classification
- Kingdom: Animalia
- Phylum: Arthropoda
- Class: Insecta
- Order: Diptera
- Family: Sciomyzidae
- Genus: Tetanocera
- Species: T. robusta

Binomial name
- Tetanocera robusta Loew, 1847

= Tetanocera robusta =

Species of fly

Tetanocera robusta is a species of fly in the family Sciomyzidae. It is found in the Palearctic and Nearctic The larvae develop in aquatic pulmonate snails including Gyraulus, Helisoma, Lymnaea, Physa, Planorbis. The habitat is marshy borders of lakes and ponds and permanent marshes.
