= Cloonee and Inchiquin Loughs, Uragh Wood =

Special Area of Conservation in County Kerry, Ireland

Coordinates: 51°48′59″N 9°42′29″W

- IUCN category IV (habitat/species management area)
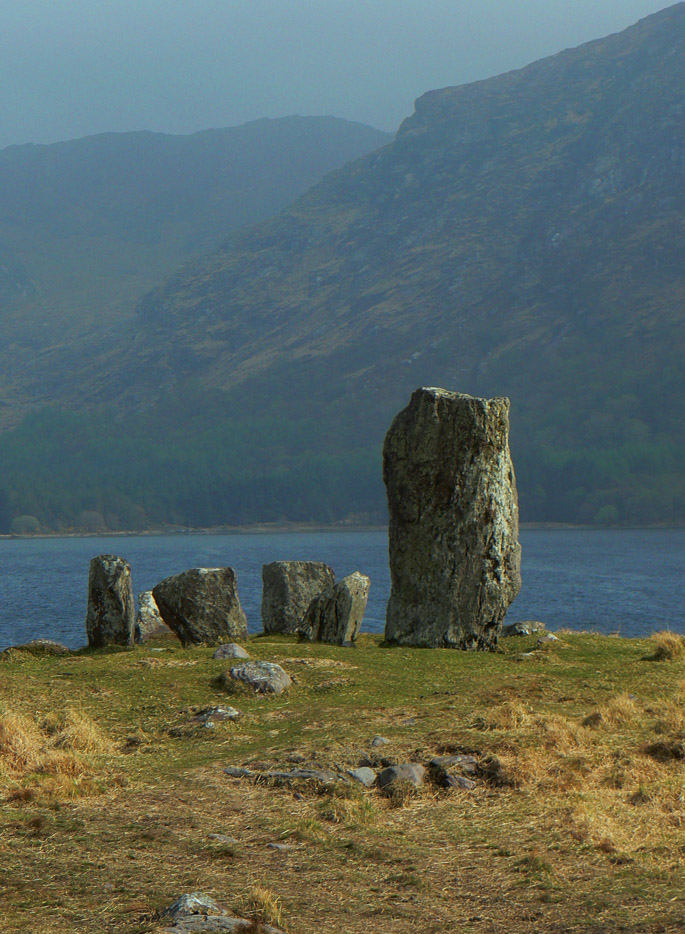
- Uragh Stone Circle with Gleninchaquin Lake and Uragh Wood in the background
- Interactive map of Cloonee and Inchiquin Loughs, Uragh Wood
- Area: 115 hectares (280 acres)
- Governing body: National Parks and Wildlife Service

Cloonee and Inchiquin Loughs, Uragh Wood is the name of a Natura 2000 site in a valley in Tuosist, County Kerry, Ireland. Habitats include lowland oligotrophic lakes (loughs) and oceanic oak woodland.

Uragh Wood has been protected as a nature reserve since 1982. A Special Area of Conservation has since been designated which protects the wood, lakes and the surrounding area. The main lakes in the area are the Salt Lake, Lower Cloonee Lough, Middle Cloonee Lough, Upper Cloonee Lough (the Cloonee Loughs) and the Gleninchaquin Lake.

This is one of the areas in which the rare Kerry slug and the lesser horseshoe bat are known to occur.
