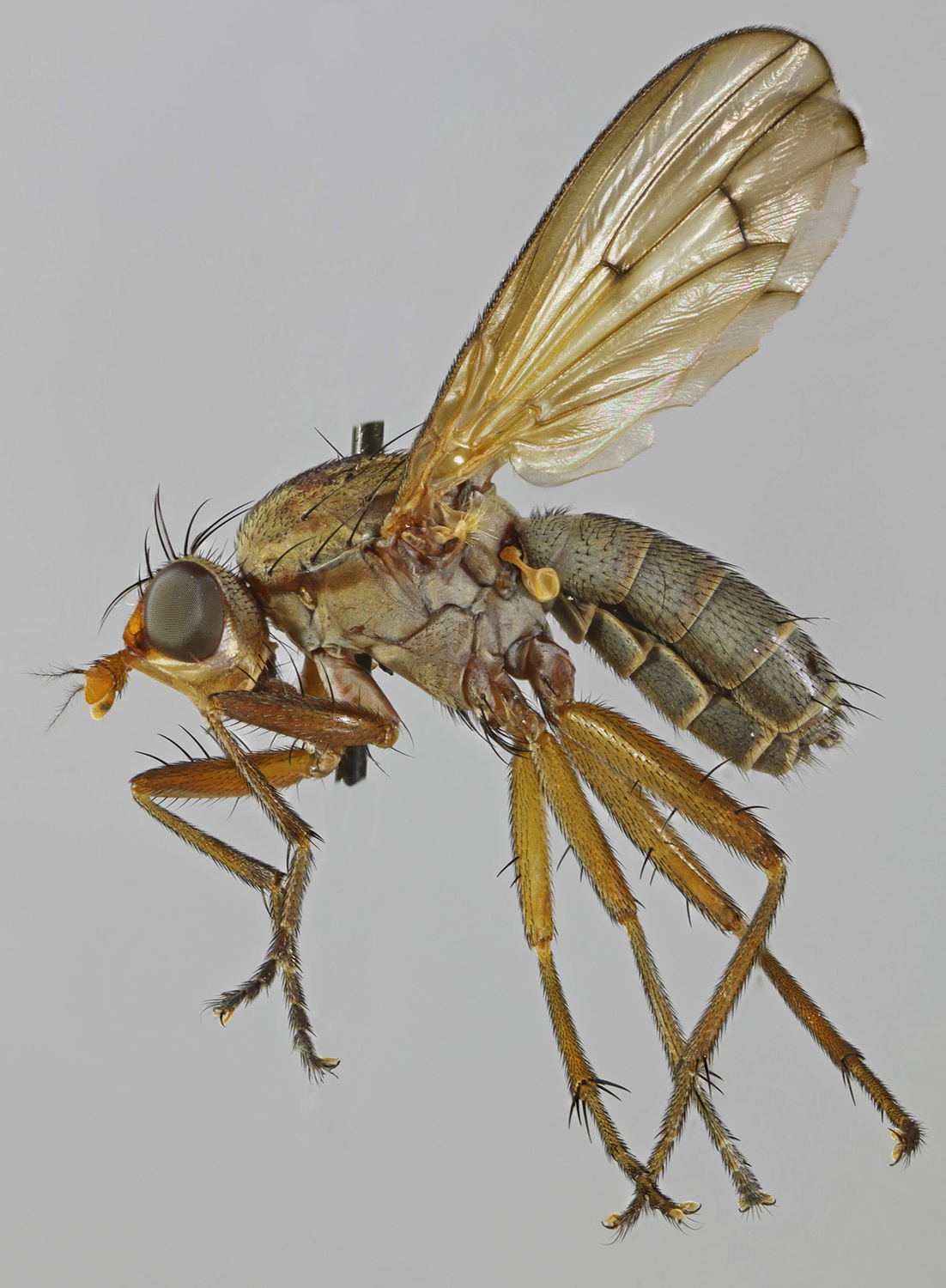
- Tetanocera ferruginea North Wales

Scientific classification
- Kingdom: Animalia
- Phylum: Arthropoda
- Clade: Pancrustacea
- Class: Insecta
- Order: Diptera
- Family: Sciomyzidae
- Genus: Tetanocera
- Species: T. ferruginea

Binomial name
- Tetanocera ferruginea Fallén, 1820

= Tetanocera ferruginea =

Species of fly

Tetanocera ferruginea is a species of fly in the family Sciomyzidae. It is found in the Palearctic The larvae feed on Lymnaeidae and Planorbidae.
