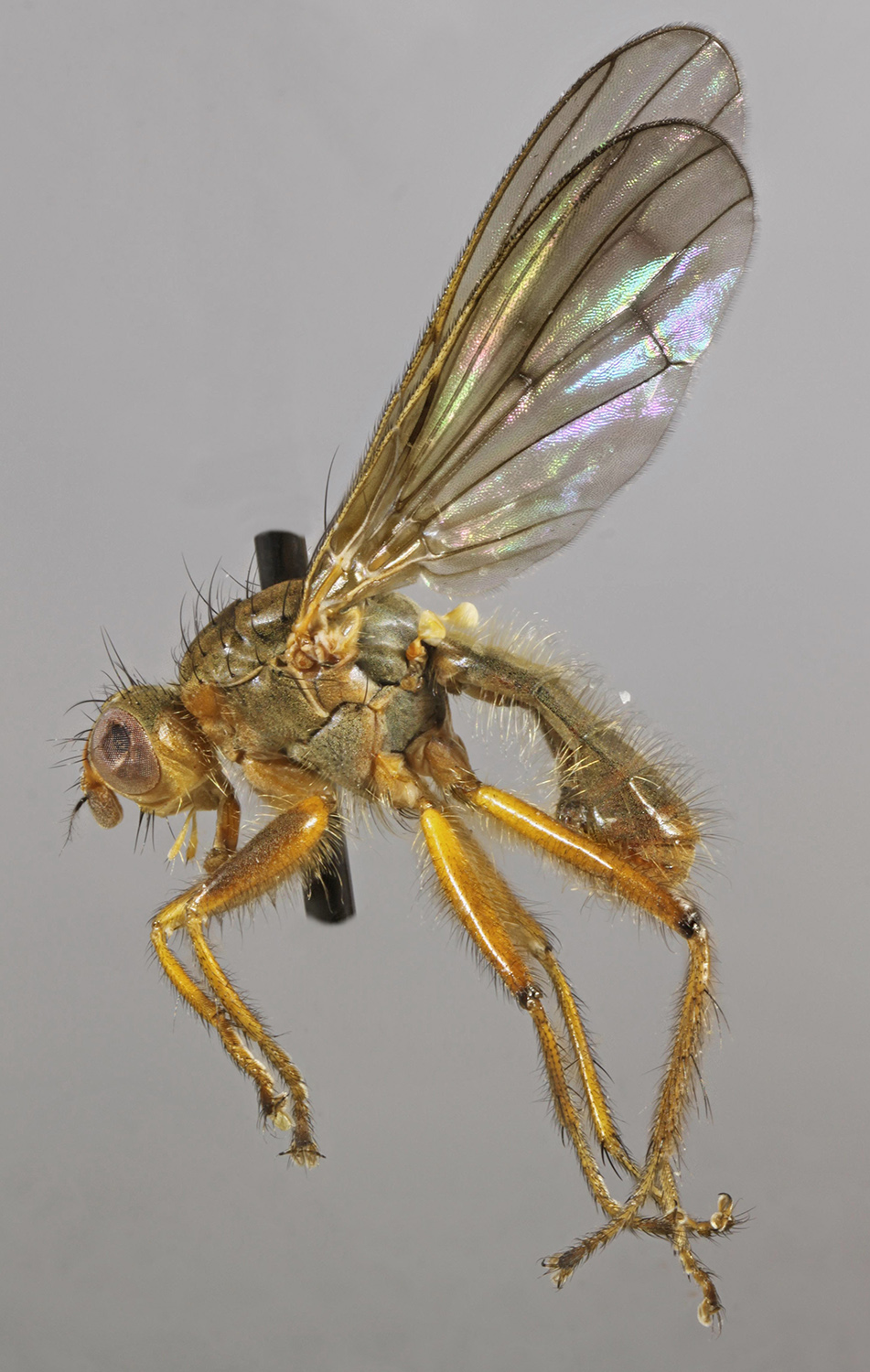
- Tetanocera arrogans North Wales

Scientific classification
- Kingdom: Animalia
- Phylum: Arthropoda
- Class: Insecta
- Order: Diptera
- Family: Sciomyzidae
- Genus: Tetanocera
- Species: T. arrogans

Binomial name
- Tetanocera arrogans Meigen, 1830

= Tetanocera arrogans =

Species of fly

Tetanocera arrogans is a species of fly in the family Sciomyzidae. It is found in the Palearctic The larva feeds on Succinea putris and other aquatic or semiaquatic snails.
