= Costa Ártabra =

Coastal area of Galicia, Spain

The Costa Ártabra

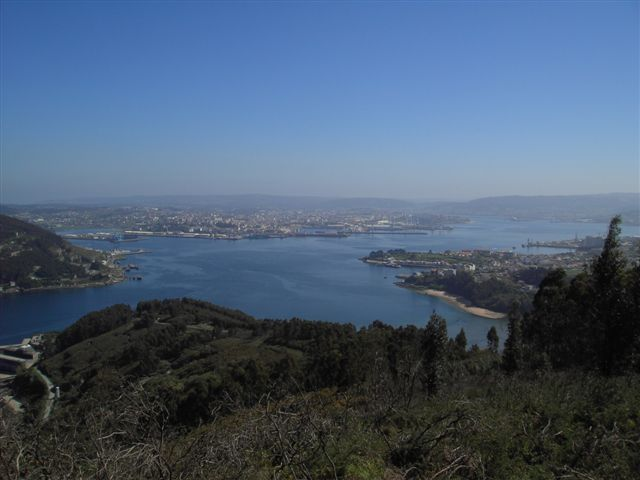
View of the ría de Ferrol.

Costa Ártabra, or Golfo Ártabro, is a coastal area of Galicia, Spain. It is comprised between the costa da Morte and the Rías Altas; it has a maximum width of 5,800 metres, and a depth of 5,600 metres corresponding to the mouth of the River Mero at Santa Cristina beach. Other rivers which have their mouth in the gulf include Mendo and Mandeo.

It corresponds to what the Greco-Roman geographers Strabo, Pomponius Mela and Pliny the Elder designated as Portus Magnus Artabrorum, a region inhabited by the Artabri people, of Celtic origin.

Costa Ártabra also the name of a nature reserve, a "Special Area of Conservation". This is one of the areas in which the rare Kerry slug is known to occur.
