= Geomalacus malagensis =

Scientific classification
- Kingdom: Animalia
- Phylum: Mollusca
- Class: Gastropoda
- Order: Stylommatophora
- Family: Arionidae
- Genus: Geomalacus
- Subgenus: Arrudia
- Species: G. malagensis

Binomial name
- Geomalacus malagensis Wiktor & Norris, 1991

Species of gastropod

Geomalacus malagensis is a species of air-breathing land slug, a terrestrial pulmonate gastropod mollusc in the family Arionidae, the round back slugs.

== Distribution ==
Distribution of Geomalacus malagensis include southern Spain and Gibraltar.

== Description ==
This slug species is pale beige-greenish to beige-grey, sometimes also yellowish-orange, with blackish narrow lateral bands having clearly marked upper edges and blurry lower edges, running from posterior end to frontal section of mantle, above the pneumostome. The shape of the slug is elongate, dorso-ventrally flattened (oval in transversal cut). The head is very short (only 2–3 mm protruding from under the mantle). Tentacles are brown and long. Mantle length covers 35% of body. There are 26 grooves between medial line of dorsum and pneumostome. Sole is dirty cream, transparent (viscera visible in live slugs), medial section narrower than lateral sections and slightly concave. Mucus is colourless and thin, also when irritated, sometimes with orange hue. Mucus secreted onto the ground while crawling breaks into thin threads and coagulates into a unique spider-web like pattern, not seen in Arion species.

The length of the body is up to 80 × 10.5 mm (preserved 58 × 11 mm).

== Ecology ==
Geomalacus malagensis is frequent on calcareous soil, in gardens, shrubland and open forests.

It seems to feed on fruits and other soft parts of plants.

Sexually mature slugs are found in spring and autumn.

Captured slugs were found infected with nematodes.
