= Tetanocera plebeja =

Scientific classification
- Kingdom: Animalia
- Phylum: Arthropoda
- Clade: Pancrustacea
- Class: Insecta
- Order: Diptera
- Family: Sciomyzidae
- Genus: Tetanocera
- Species: T. plebeja

Binomial name
- Tetanocera plebeja Loew, 1862

Species of fly

Tetanocera plebeja is a species of marsh fly in the family Sciomyzidae.
