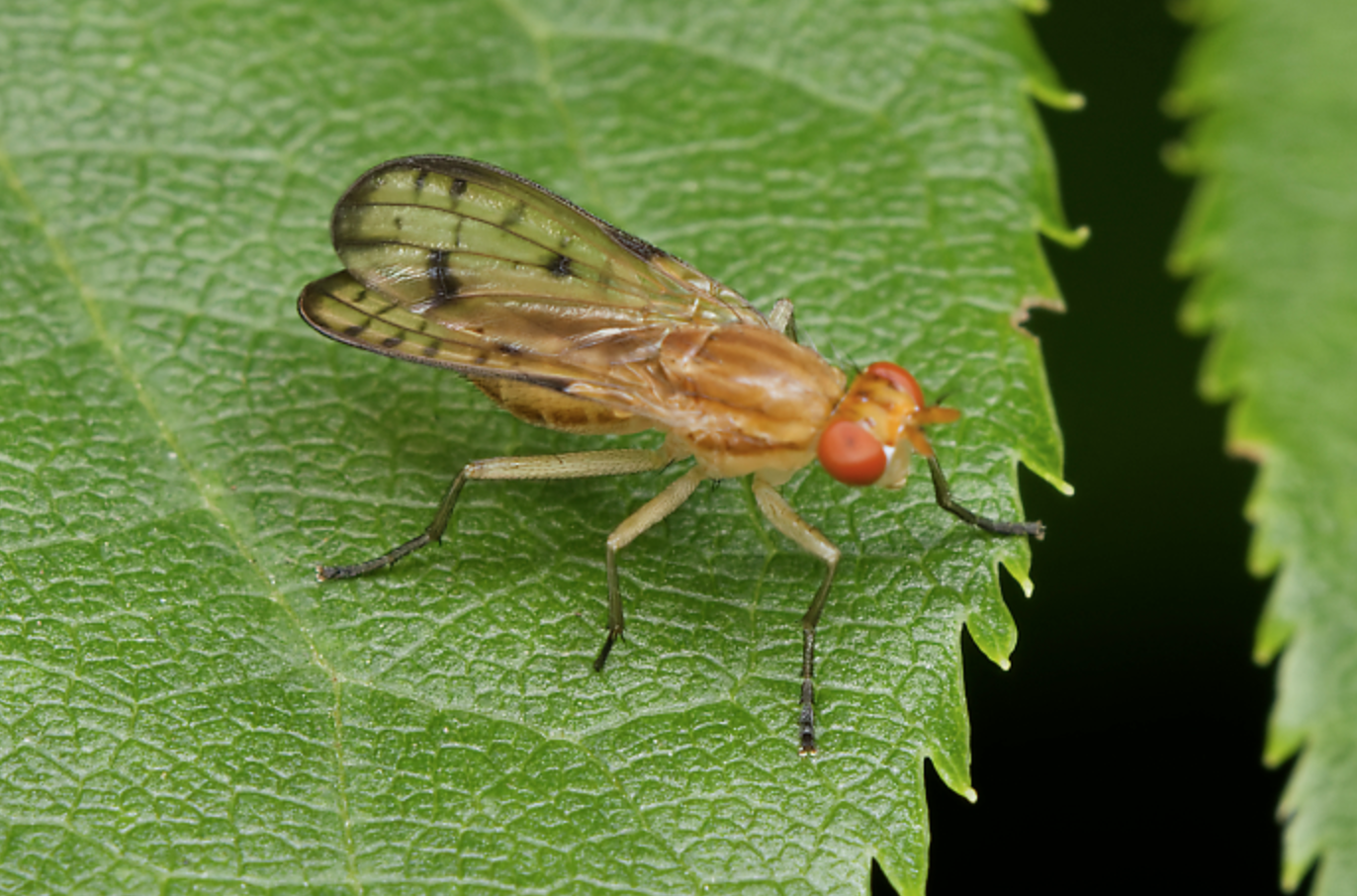
- Tetanocera clara seen in Quebec

Scientific classification
- Domain: Eukaryota
- Kingdom: Animalia
- Phylum: Arthropoda
- Class: Insecta
- Order: Diptera
- Family: Sciomyzidae
- Genus: Tetanocera
- Species: T. clara

Binomial name
- Tetanocera clara Loew, 1862

= Tetanocera clara =

Species of fly

Tetanocera clara is a species of marsh fly in the family Sciomyzidae.
