= Geomalacus oliveirae =

Scientific classification
- Kingdom: Animalia
- Phylum: Mollusca
- Class: Gastropoda
- Order: Stylommatophora
- Family: Arionidae
- Genus: Geomalacus
- Subgenus: Arrudia
- Species: G. oliveirae

Binomial name
- Geomalacus oliveirae Simroth, 1891

Species of gastropod

Geomalacus oliveirae is a species of air-breathing land slug, a terrestrial pulmonate gastropod mollusc in the family Arionidae, the round back slugs.

== Distribution ==
Distribution of Geomalacus oliveirae include:

- Portugal (Beira Alta)
- Spain (Toledo, Cáceres, Salamanca) - Red List Spain: Sensitive to habitat change (Gómez Moliner et al. 2001).

== Description ==
Geomalacus oliveirae is a slug light with 4 black colour bands, inner bands are irregularly interrupted, main marginal bands sharply delimited against the light background. The length of the body of preserved specimen is 20 mm.

Reproductive system: Genital retractor inserts more anteriorly in the median line of dorsum than in the other species.

== Ecology ==
Geomalacus oliveirae lives in Portugal in Mediterranean shrubland and on granitic substrate, also under Betula, Pinus and Juniperus trees, below 1300 m. It lives in Spain under Pinus and in olive orchards.
