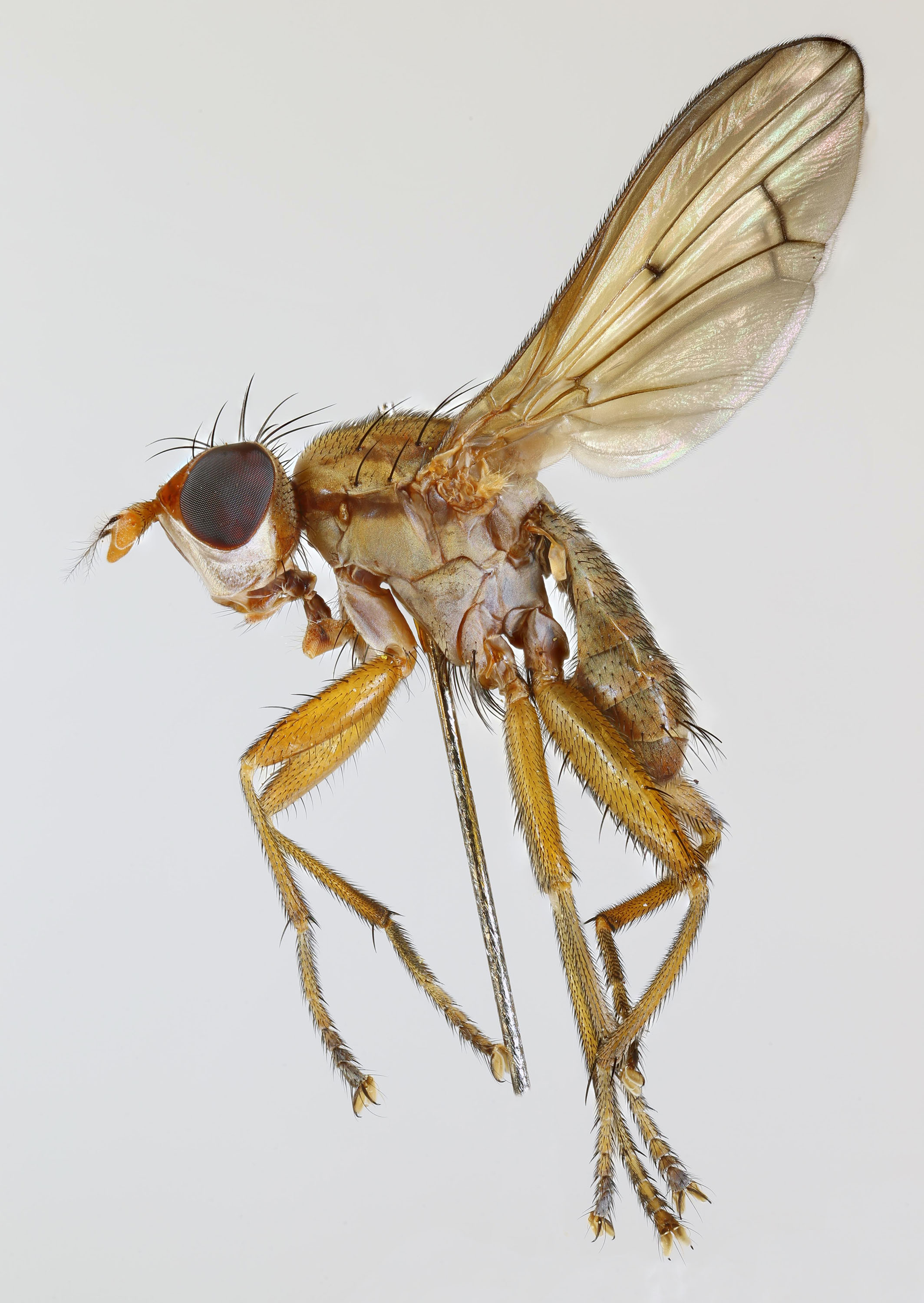
- Tetanocera elata North Wales

Scientific classification
- Kingdom: Animalia
- Phylum: Arthropoda
- Clade: Pancrustacea
- Class: Insecta
- Order: Diptera
- Family: Sciomyzidae
- Genus: Tetanocera
- Species: T. elata

Binomial name
- Tetanocera elata (Fabricius, 1781)

= Tetanocera elata =

Species of fly

Tetanocera elata is a species of fly in the family Sciomyzidae. It is found in the Palearctic Larvae of T. elata are known obligate feeders on slugs both as parasitoids and predators.
