= Uragh Stone Circle =

Axial five-stone circle in County Kerry, Ireland

Coordinates: 51°48′42.23″N 9°41′37.74″W

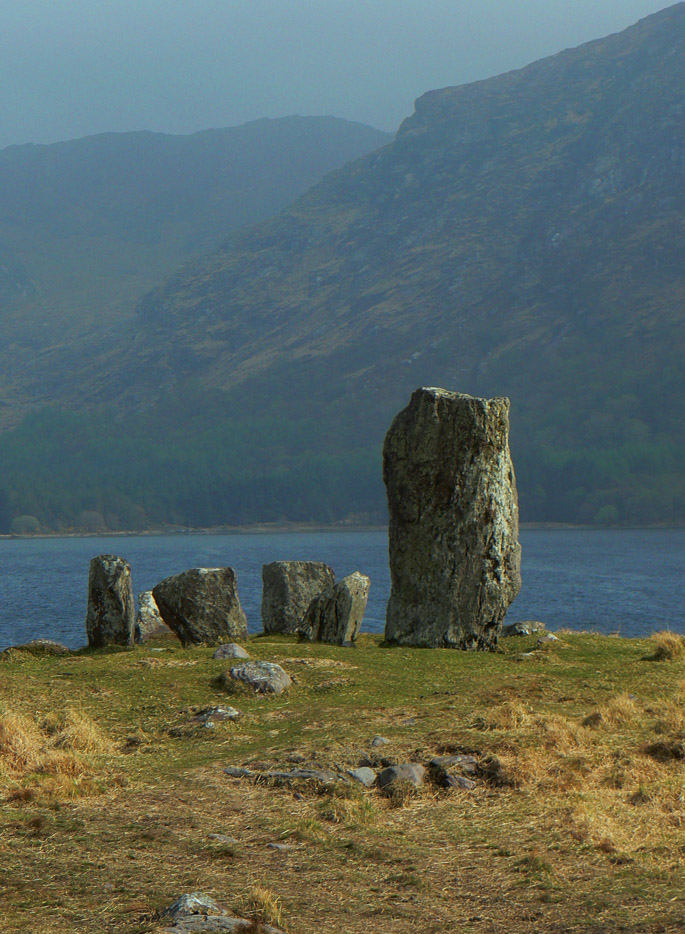
The Uragh Stone Circle.

The Uragh Stone Circle is an axial five-stone circle located near Gleninchaquin Park, County Kerry, Ireland. The Bronze Age site includes a multiple stone circle and some boulder burials.

== Description ==
The Uragh Stone Circle is a small Bronze Age axial stone circle. It is located on the Beara Peninsula, near Gleninchaquin Park, County Kerry, Ireland. Situated between Lough Inchiquin and Lough Cloonee Upper, the site consists of five low megaliths situated next to a large standing stone. Altogether, there are two portal stones, two side stones and the axial (recumbent) stone. The largest standing stone is ten feet (3.0 m) high and the circle is eight feet (2.4 m) in diameter. The centre of the circle has been dug out by treasure seekers. There are a number of other monuments nearby, including a multiple stone circle and some boulder burials.

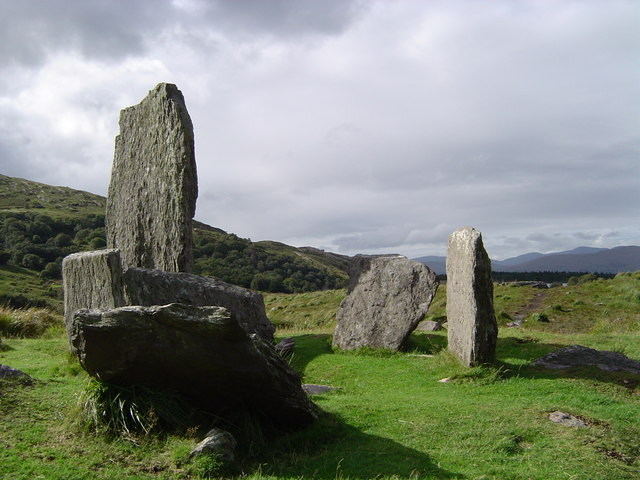
The Uragh Stone Circle.

== History ==
Stone circles are circular arrangements of standing stones, dating from the late Neolithic era through the Early Bronze Age. Monuments were constructed from 3300 to 900 BCE. They are commonly found throughout Britain, Ireland and Brittany. In Ireland, the monuments are distributed primarily in County Cork, County Kerry and in central Ulster. In Ulster, the typical stone circle is constructed of a large number of small stones, usually 0.3 m high, and are often found at higher elevations. There are more than 1300 surviving stone circles in Britain, Ireland, and Brittany today. The original purpose for stone circles in unknown, but many archaeologists believe that they were used for multiple purposes, including burials, religious or ceremonial purposes, and community gatherings. It has also been suggested that the stones were situated in relation to meaningful solar and lunar alignments.

In County Cork and County Kerry (Cork-Kerry), there are 79 surviving stone circles. The typical Cork-Kerry stone circle contains a ring of large standing stones, symmetrically arranged in generally a northeast–southwest direction. The axial stone is usually positioned directly opposite the stones marking the entrance to the circle. The entrance stones are generally the tallest stones of the circle and the other orthostats decrease in height as they get closer to the axial stone. The axial stone is generally the shortest stone of the circle. The stone circle monuments may also have other stone alignments, cairns or enclosures nearby. All of the 5-stone circles in Cork-Kerry are D-shaped with the axial stone forming the line of the D.
