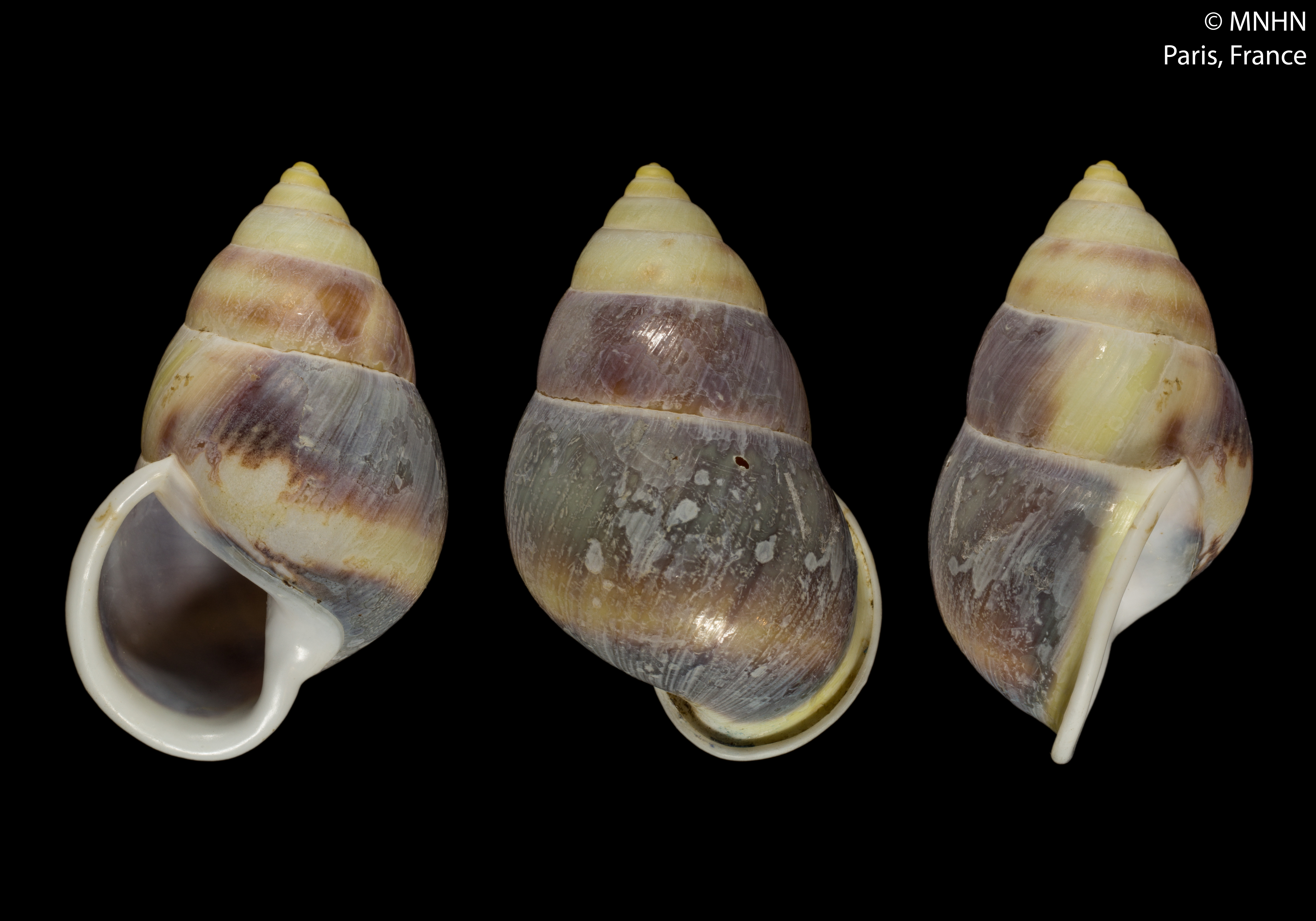
- Shell of Amphidromus jeffabbasorum (holotype at MNHN, Paris)

Scientific classification
- Kingdom: Animalia
- Phylum: Mollusca
- Class: Gastropoda
- Order: Stylommatophora
- Family: Camaenidae
- Genus: Amphidromus
- Species: A. jeffabbasorum

Binomial name
- Amphidromus jeffabbasorum Thach, 2016

Synonyms
- Amphidromus (Amphidromus) jeffabbasorum Thach, 2016 alternative representation

= Amphidromus jeffabbasorum =

Species of snail in the family Camaenidae

Amphidromus jeffabbasorum is a species of medium-sized air-breathing tree snail, an arboreal gastropod mollusk in the family Camaenidae.

== Distribution ==
This species is endemic to Java, Indonesia.
