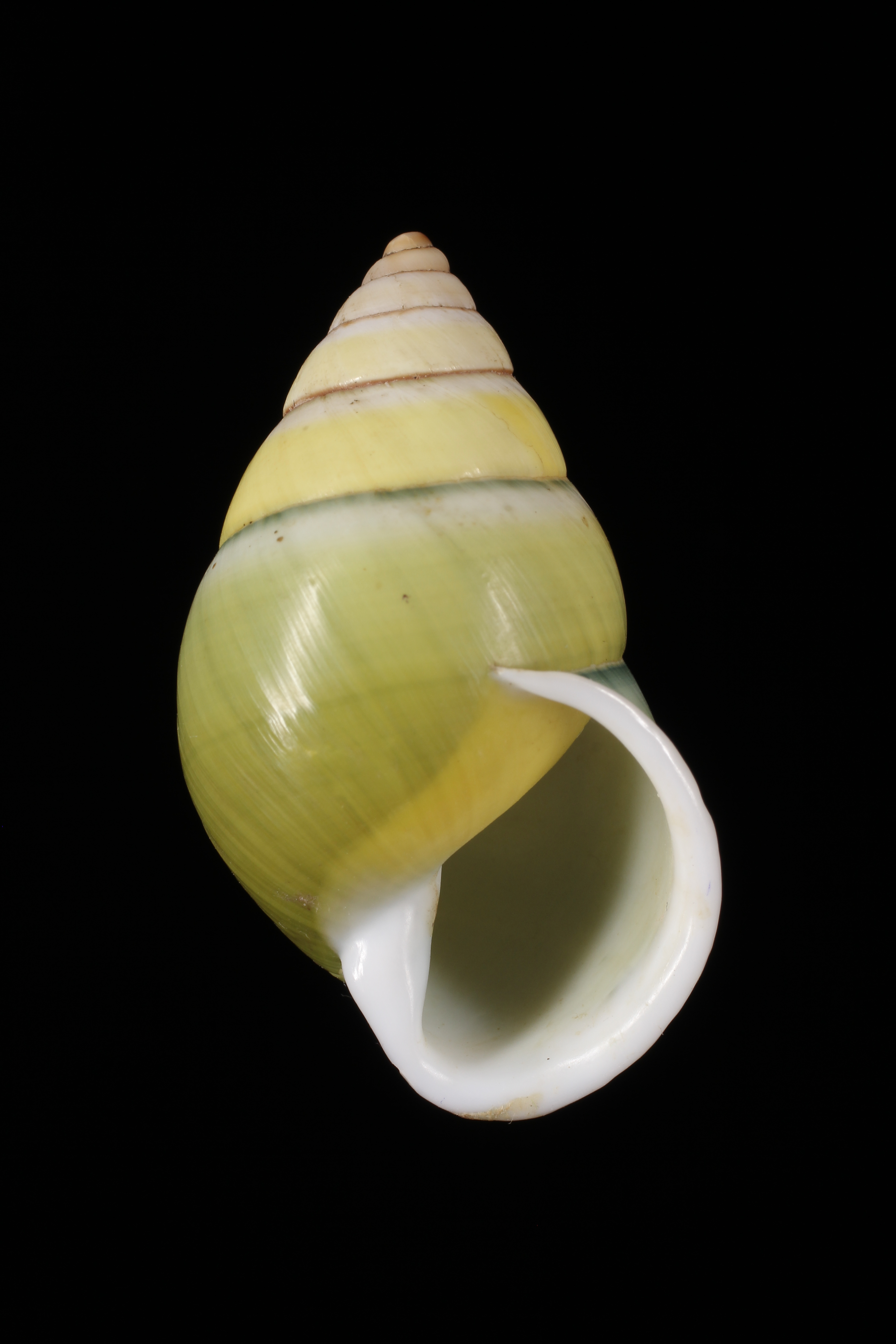
- Shell of Amphidromus anhduongae (holotype at MNHN, Paris)

Scientific classification
- Kingdom: Animalia
- Phylum: Mollusca
- Class: Gastropoda
- Order: Stylommatophora
- Family: Camaenidae
- Genus: Amphidromus
- Species: A. anhduongae

Binomial name
- Amphidromus anhduongae Thach, 2020

= Amphidromus anhduongae =

Species of tree snail

Amphidromus anhduongae is a species of air-breathing tree snail, an arboreal gastropod mollusk in the family Camaenidae.

== Description ==
The length of the shell attains 38.9 mm.

== Distribution ==
This species is endemic to Laos.
