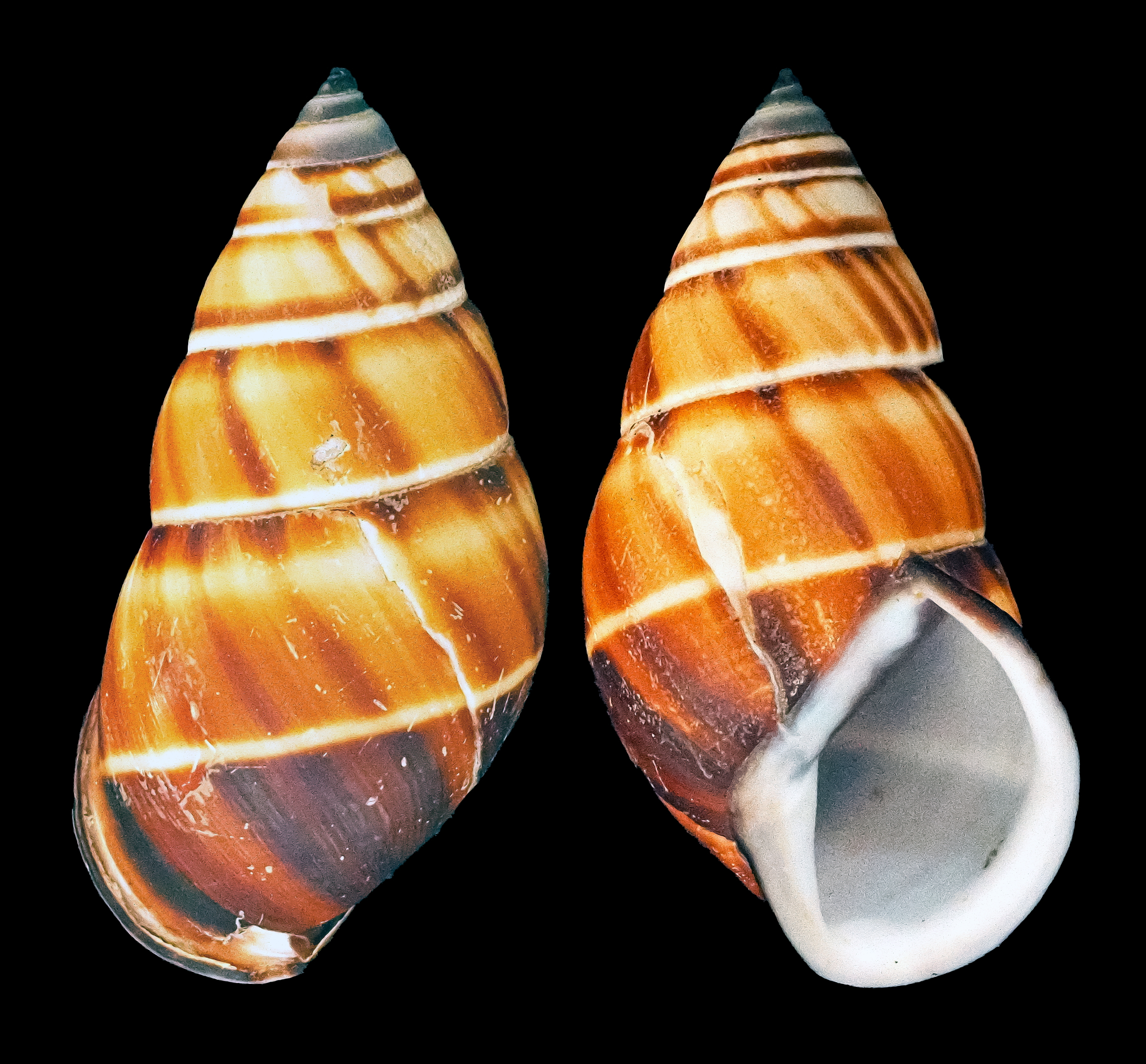
- Shell of Amphidromus tuanhae (holotype at the MNHN, Paris)

Scientific classification
- Kingdom: Animalia
- Phylum: Mollusca
- Class: Gastropoda
- Order: Stylommatophora
- Family: Camaenidae
- Genus: Amphidromus
- Species: A. tuanhae

Binomial name
- Amphidromus tuanhae Thach, 2021

= Amphidromus tuanhae =

Species of tree snail

Amphidromus tuanhae is a species of air-breathing tree snail, an arboreal gastropod mollusk in the family Camaenidae.

== Description ==
The length of this dextral shell attains 52.5 mm.

== Distribution ==
This species is endemic to Vietnam.
