= Amphidromus xiongxiaoxiaoi =

Scientific classification
- Kingdom: Animalia
- Phylum: Mollusca
- Class: Gastropoda
- Order: Stylommatophora
- Family: Camaenidae
- Genus: Amphidromus
- Species: A. xiongxiaoxiaoi

Binomial name
- Amphidromus xiongxiaoxiaoi.-C. Wang, 2023

Species of snail in the family Camaenidae

Amphidromus xiongxiaoxiaoi is a species of medium-sized air-breathing tree snail, an arboreal gastropod mollusk in the family Camaenidae.

== Habitat ==
This species lives in trees.

== Distribution ==
The type locality of this species is Vietnam.
