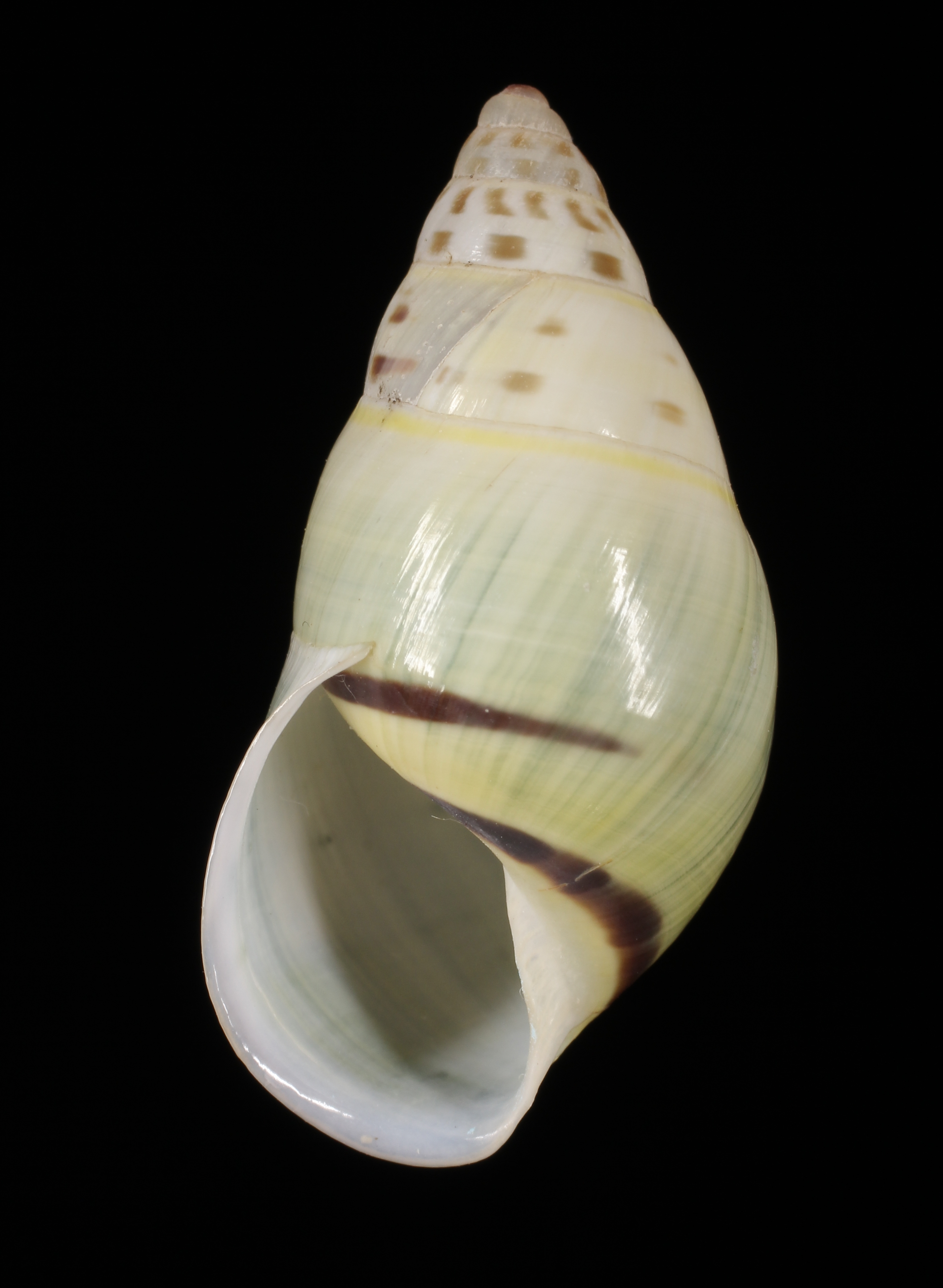
- Shell of Amphidromus hejingi (holotype at MNHN, Paris)

Scientific classification
- Kingdom: Animalia
- Phylum: Mollusca
- Class: Gastropoda
- Order: Stylommatophora
- Family: Camaenidae
- Genus: Amphidromus
- Species: A. hejingi

Binomial name
- Amphidromus hejingi Thach, 2019

= Amphidromus hejingi =

Species of snail in the family Camaenidae

Amphidromus hejingi is a species of medium-sized air-breathing tree snail, an arboreal gastropod mollusk in the family Camaenidae.

== Subspecies ==
- Amphidromus hejingi arlinicoi Thach, 2020
- Amphidromus hejingi hejingi Thach, 2019

== Description ==
The length of the shell attains 28.2 mm.

== Habitat ==
This species lives in trees.

== Distribution ==
The type locality of this species is Vietnam.
