= Amphidromus parsonsi =

Scientific classification
- Kingdom: Animalia
- Phylum: Mollusca
- Class: Gastropoda
- Order: Stylommatophora
- Family: Camaenidae
- Genus: Amphidromus
- Species: A. parsonsi

Binomial name
- Amphidromus parsonsi Thach, Abbas & Lie, 2024

Species of tree snail

Amphidromus parsonsi is a species of air-breathing tree snail, an arboreal gastropod mollusk in the family Camaenidae.

== Distribution ==
This species is endemic to Maluku Islands, Indonesia.
