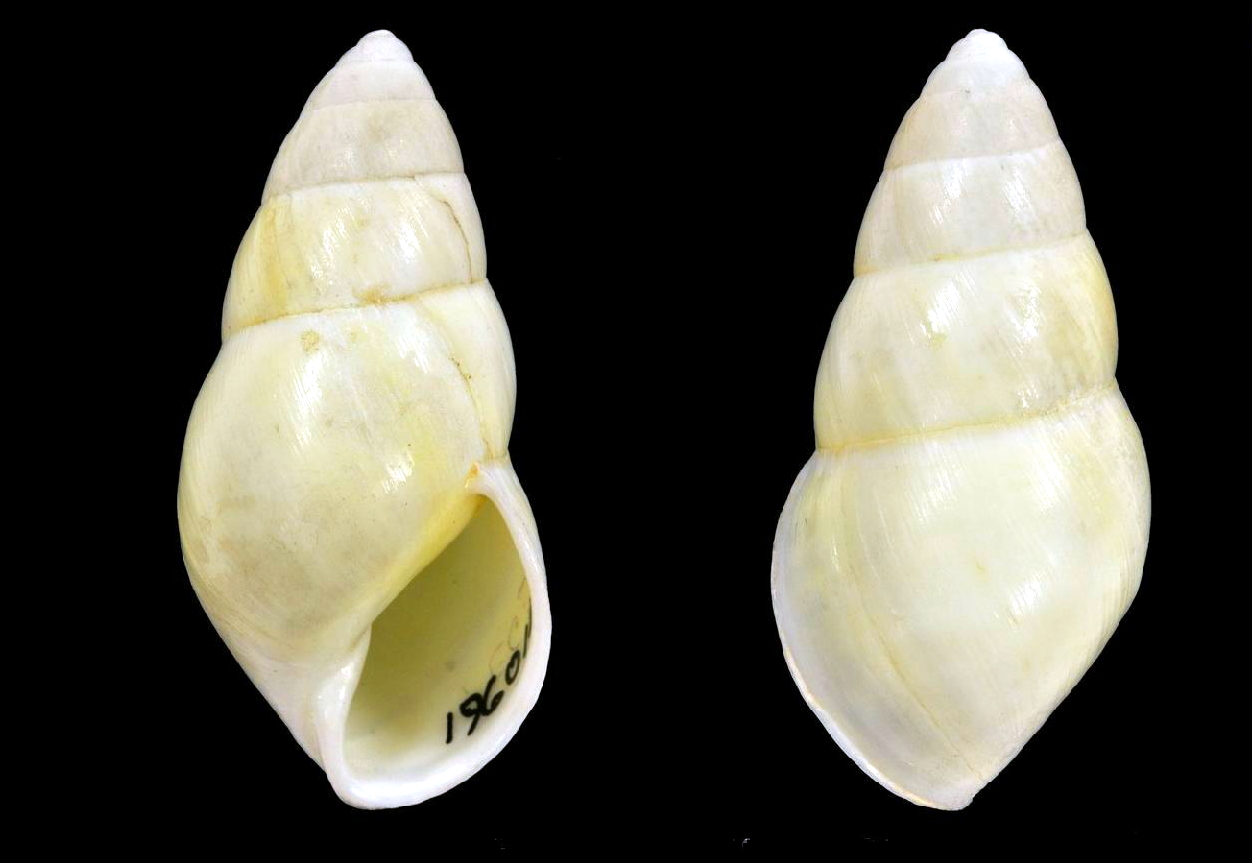
- Shell of Amphidromus cochinchinensis (lectotype at the Natural History Museum, London)

Scientific classification
- Kingdom: Animalia
- Phylum: Mollusca
- Class: Gastropoda
- Order: Stylommatophora
- Family: Camaenidae
- Genus: Amphidromus
- Species: A. cochinchinensis

Binomial name
- Amphidromus cochinchinensis (L. Pfeiffer, 1857)

Synonyms
- Bulimus cochinchinensis L. Pfeiffer, 1857 (original combination)

= Amphidromus cochinchinensis =

Species of snail in the family Camaenidae

Amphidromus cochinchinensis is a species of medium-sized air-breathing tree snail, an arboreal gastropod mollusk in the family Camaenidae.

== Description ==
The length of the shell attains 39 mm, its diameter 17 mm.

The solid shell is imperforate, fusiform-ovate, smooth and glossy. It is pale sulfur-yellow or whitish. The spire is somewhat convex-turreted. The apex somewhat blunt. The suture is smooth and pale. The shell contains 6 to 7 whorls, the upper ones rather flat, the following ones more convex, the body whorl nearly equaling 2/3 of the length, attenuate at the base and somewhat compressed. The columella is rope-like and slightly twisted. The aperture is slightly oblique and elliptical-oval. The peristome is somewhat thickened, with the right lip shortly expanded, the columellar margin dilated and adnate. (Note: Original description in Latin.)

== Habitat ==
This species lives in trees.

== Distribution ==
The type locality of this species is Vietnam.
