= Amphidromus jomi =

Scientific classification
- Kingdom: Animalia
- Phylum: Mollusca
- Class: Gastropoda
- Order: Stylommatophora
- Family: Camaenidae
- Genus: Amphidromus
- Species: A. jomi

Binomial name
- Amphidromus jomi Dumrongrojwattana, Wongkamhaeng & Tanamai, 2019

Synonyms
- Amphidromus (Syndromus) jomi Dumrongrojwattana, Wongkamhaeng & Tanamai, 2019 · alternative representation

Species of snail in the family Camaenidae

Amphidromus jomi is a species of medium-sized air-breathing tree snail, an arboreal gastropod mollusk in the family Camaenidae.

== Distribution ==
This species is endemic to Vietnam.
