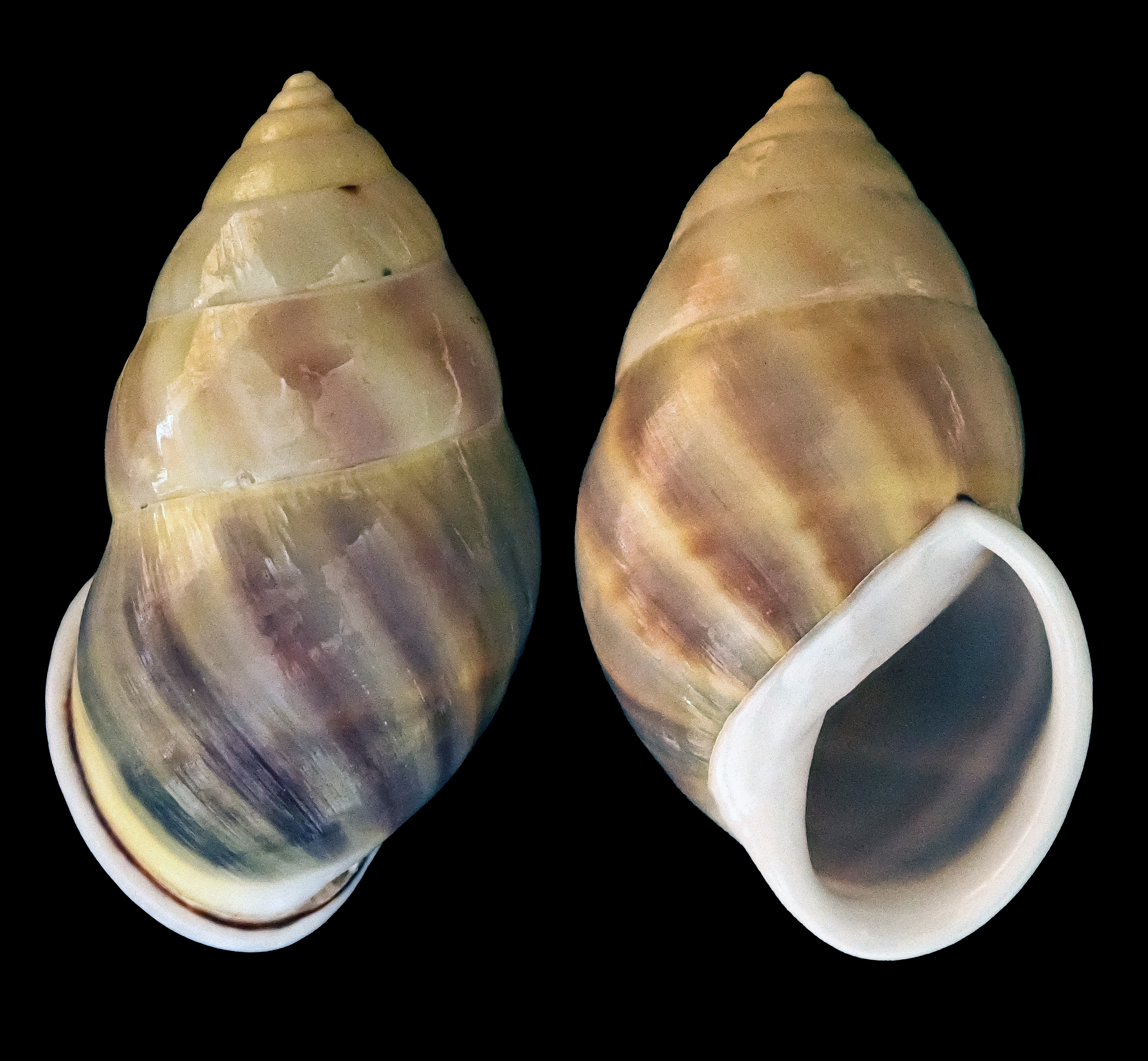
- Shell of Amphidromus jadeni (holotype at the MNHN, Paris)

Scientific classification
- Kingdom: Animalia
- Phylum: Mollusca
- Class: Gastropoda
- Order: Stylommatophora
- Family: Camaenidae
- Genus: Amphidromus
- Species: A. jadeni

Binomial name
- Amphidromus jadeni Thach, 2021

= Amphidromus jadeni =

Species of tree snail

Amphidromus jadeni is a species of air-breathing tree snail, an arboreal gastropod mollusk in the family Camaenidae.

== Description ==
The length of this dextral shell attains 44.5 mm.

== Distribution ==
This species is endemic to Vietnam, primarily the Kbang District of Gia Lai Province, where it is found among leaf litter.
