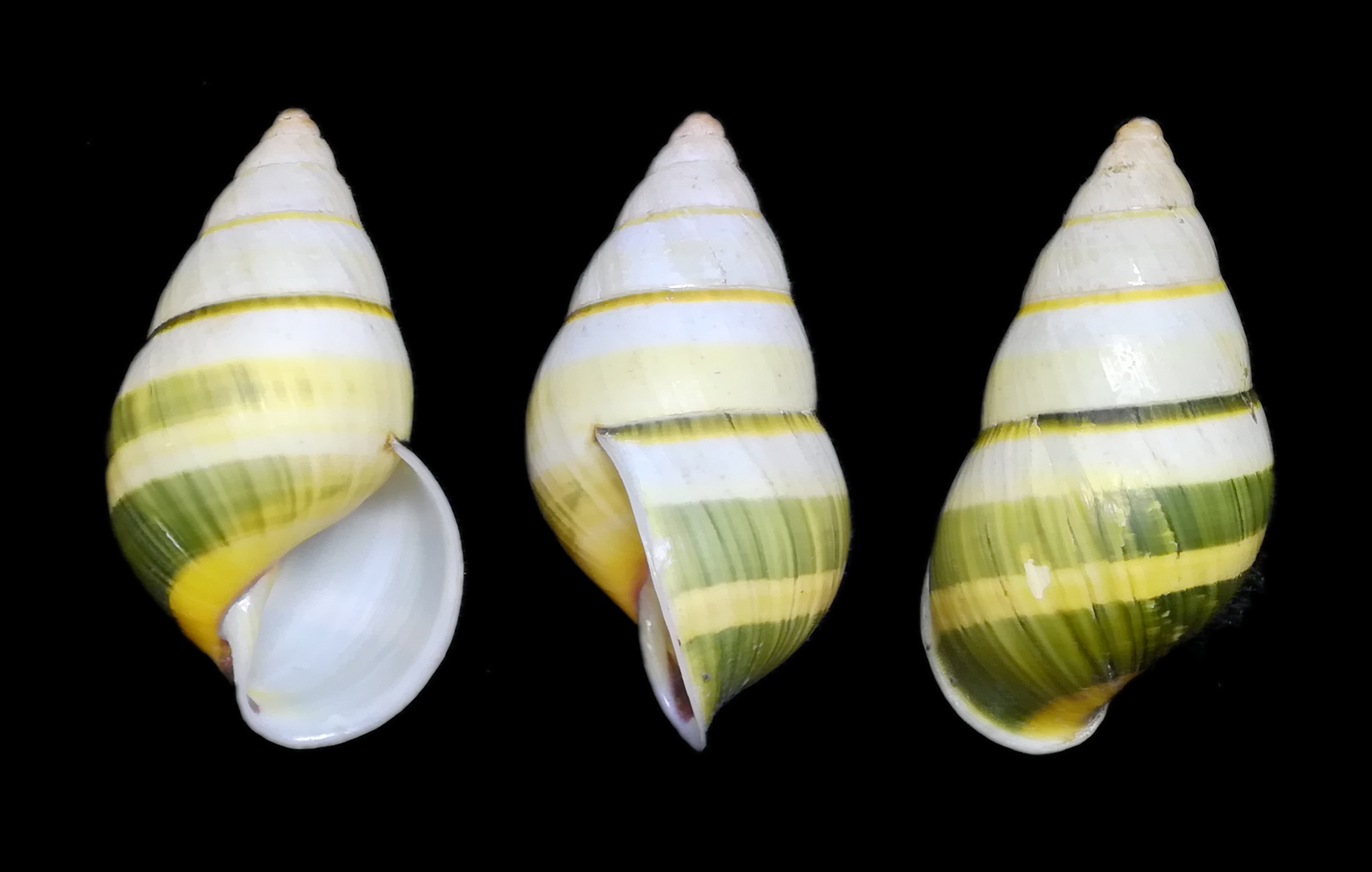

Scientific classification
- Kingdom: Animalia
- Phylum: Mollusca
- Class: Gastropoda
- Order: Stylommatophora
- Family: Camaenidae
- Genus: Amphidromus
- Species: A. arlingi

Binomial name
- Amphidromus arlingi Thach, 2017

= Amphidromus arlingi =

Species of gastropod

Amphidromus arlingi is a species of air-breathing tree snail, an arboreal gastropod mollusk in the family Camaenidae.

== Distribution ==
This species is recorded in Vietnam.

== Habitat ==
Tree dwellers.

== Etymology ==
This species is named after Nico Arling.

== Subspecies ==
There are two subspecies of Amphidromus arlingi:

- Amphidromus arlingi arlingi Thach, 2017
- Amphidromus arlingi daklakensis Thach, 2017
