= Amphidromus sylviae =

Scientific classification
- Domain: Eukaryota
- Kingdom: Animalia
- Phylum: Mollusca
- Class: Gastropoda
- Order: Stylommatophora
- Family: Camaenidae
- Genus: Amphidromus
- Species: A. sylviae

Binomial name
- Amphidromus sylviae Stark, 2017

Synonyms
- Amphidromus (Syndromus) sylviae Stark, 2017 alternative representation

Species of tree snail

Amphidromus sylviae is a species of air-breathing tree snail, an arboreal gastropod mollusk in the family Camaenidae.

== Distribution ==
This species is endemic to Vietnam.
