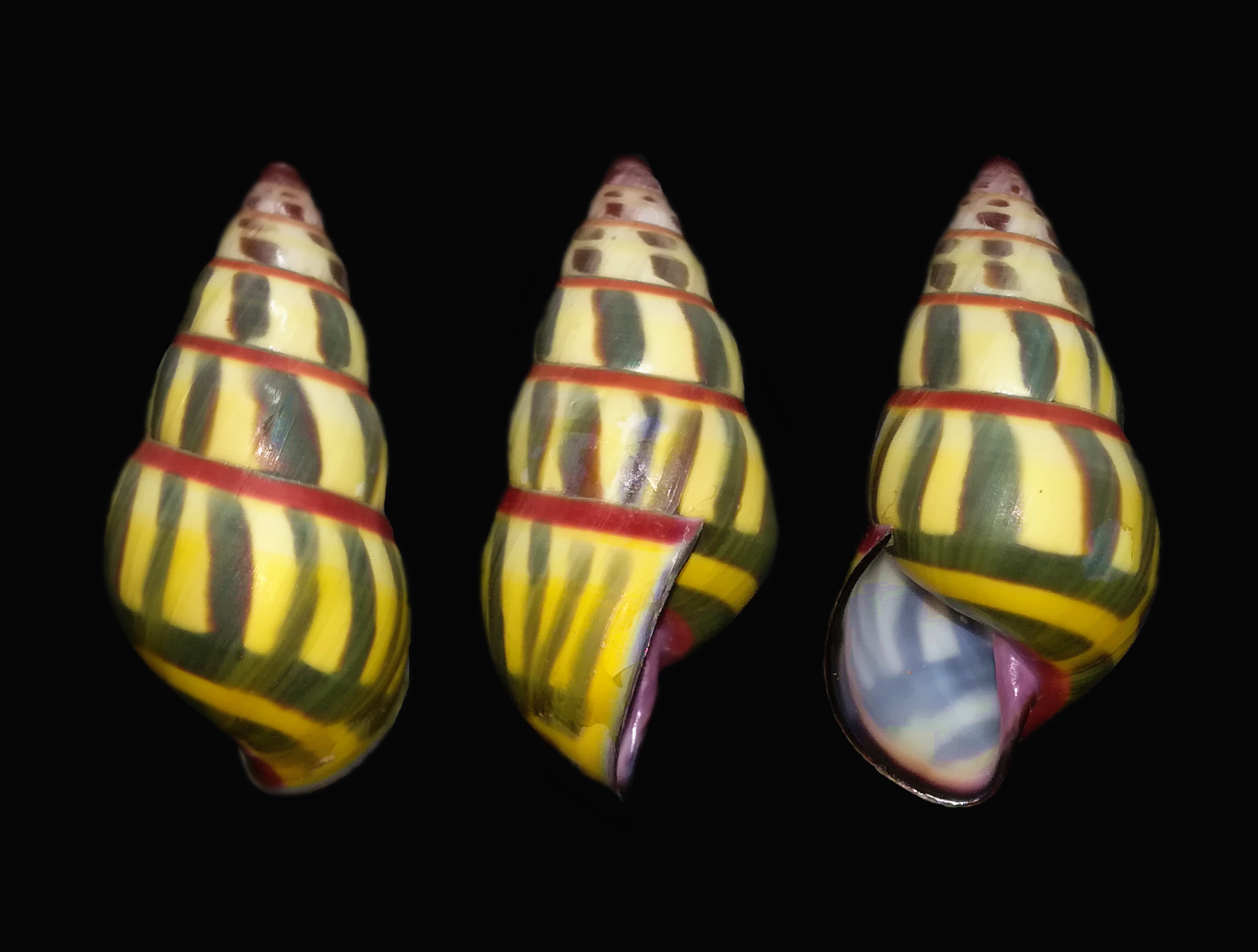

Scientific classification
- Domain: Eukaryota
- Kingdom: Animalia
- Phylum: Mollusca
- Class: Gastropoda
- Order: Stylommatophora
- Family: Camaenidae
- Genus: Amphidromus
- Species: A. mariae

Binomial name
- Amphidromus mariae Thach & Huber, 2017

= Amphidromus mariae =

Species of air-breathing tree snail

Amphidromus mariae is a species of air-breathing tree snail. It is an arboreal gastropod mollusk in the family Camaenidae.

== Morphology ==
Medium-sized sinistral shell with black outer lip and black or brown axial stripes. According to the original description, the shell has orange subsutural, while specimens with scarlet subsutural are also recorded.

== Distribution ==
Central Vietnam, Đắk Lắk Province.

== Habitat ==
Tree dwellers.

== Etymology ==
This species is named after Maria Senders, a Canadian landsnail lover who assisted a lot in the collecting trip.
