= Amphidromus fultoni =

Scientific classification
- Domain: Eukaryota
- Kingdom: Animalia
- Phylum: Mollusca
- Class: Gastropoda
- Order: Stylommatophora
- Family: Camaenidae
- Genus: Amphidromus
- Species: A. fultoni

Binomial name
- Amphidromus fultoni Ancey, 1897

Synonyms
- Amphidromus (Syndromus) fultoni Ancey, 1897 alternative representation; Syndromus fultoni (Ancey, 1897)

Species of snail in the family Camaenidae

Amphidromus fultoni is a species of medium-sized air-breathing tree snail, an arboreal gastropod mollusk in the family Camaenidae.

== Description ==
The length of the shell attains 23.5 mm, its diameter 14 mm.

(Original description) The sinistral shell is short, and ovate-conic. It features a narrowly perforate, thin, obliquely striated structure. It appears subangulate at the periphery, primarily at the commencement of the body whorl. The spire is rather shortly conic, with a dark brown apex. The shell comprises six whorls. The initial whorls are distinctly convex, while the body whorl is barely so. The apical whorls present a white color, and the subsequent whorls are pale lemon-colored. The third whorl is ornamented with two faint series of pale brownish and very small spots. The body whorl exhibits a narrow yellow zone below the suture, bordered by an indistinct, broad, white band, and bears two fine brown spiral lines, more or less evanescent towards the aperture, the upper line at the periphery, the lower encircling the yellow umbilical region. The aperture is oblique. The columella is straight, thin, expanded, and white. The outer lip is thin, white, and slightly expanded.

== Habitat ==
This species lives in trees.

== Distribution ==
The type locality of this species is Vietnam, Laos and India.
