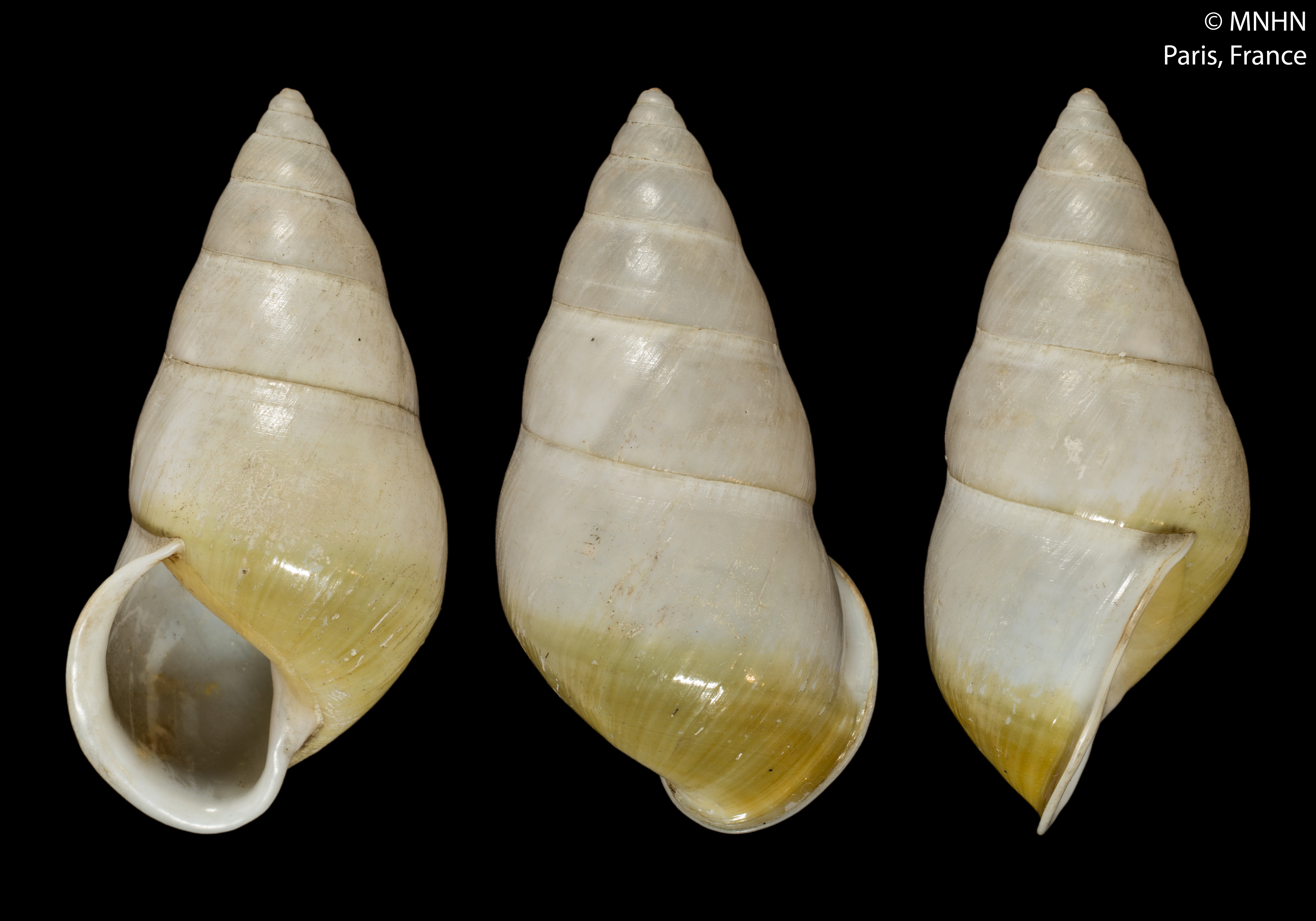
- Shell of Amphidromus dautzenbergi (syntype at the Natural History Museum, Paris)

Scientific classification
- Kingdom: Animalia
- Phylum: Mollusca
- Class: Gastropoda
- Order: Stylommatophora
- Family: Camaenidae
- Genus: Amphidromus
- Species: A. dautzenbergi

Binomial name
- Amphidromus dautzenbergi Fulton, 1899

Synonyms
- Aegistohadra dautzenbergi (Fulton, 1899) superseded combination; Amphidromus (Amphidromus) pervariabilis Bavay & Dautzenberg, 1909

= Amphidromus dautzenbergi =

Species of tree snail

Amphidromus dautzenbergi is a species of air-breathing tree snail, an arboreal gastropod mollusk in the family Camaenidae.

== Description ==
The length of this dextral shell attains 42 mm, its diameter 21 mm

(Original description) The dextral shell is oblong-conic, possessing a very narrow umbilicus. Its surface appears slightly polished and of moderate solidity, presenting a whitish coloration above that transitions to greenish-yellow below. The shell exhibits obscure spiral striations. The suture of the body whorl is slightly impressed and bordered by a narrow white band. It comprises approximately 6.75 whorls, with the body whorl being obtusely angulated above the aperture at the periphery and the final half showing indistinct malleations. The aperture is semi-oval and white within. The peristome appears moderately expanded and white, with its margins joined by a very thin callus. The columella stands almost erect, and is rounded, and widens at its point of insertion.

== Distribution ==
This species is endemic to Central Vietnam.
