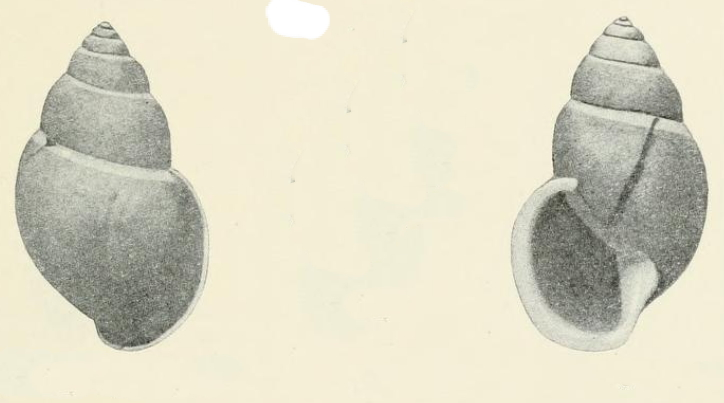
- Shells of Amphidromus hildagoi (holotype)

Scientific classification
- Kingdom: Animalia
- Phylum: Mollusca
- Class: Gastropoda
- Order: Stylommatophora
- Family: Camaenidae
- Genus: Amphidromus
- Species: A. hildagoi

Binomial name
- Amphidromus hildagoi Bartsch, 1917

= Amphidromus hildagoi =

Species of tree snail

Amphidromus hildagoi is a species of air-breathing tree snail, an arboreal gastropod mollusk in the family Camaenidae.

== Description ==
The length of the shell attains 60 mm; its diameter 35.5 mm

(Original description) The large shell is inflated. The initial whorls exhibit the characteristic narrow black band directly above the suture. Subsequent whorls are inflated, appressed at the apex, and lemon-yellow, displaying a narrow whitish band at the apex and irregularly distributed dark rust-brown markings. A variceal streak of the same color marks the body whorl. The aperture is broad, flaring, and strongly reflected, dark within, with a white margin.

== Distribution ==
This sinistral species is endemic to Mindanao, Philippines.
