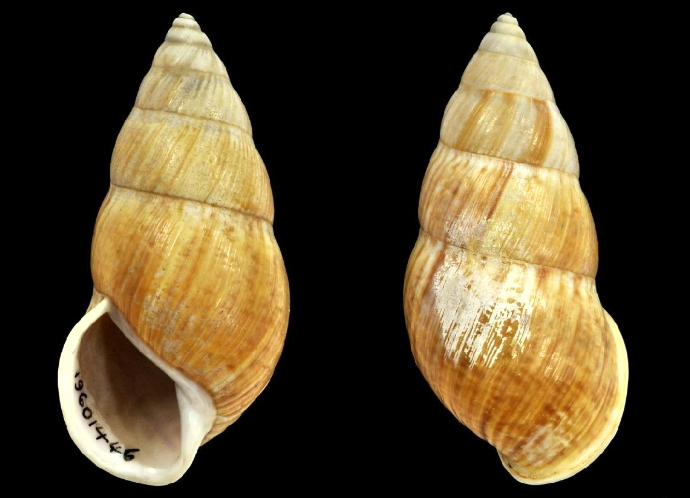
- Shell of Amphidromus loricatus (lectotype at the MNHUK, London)

Scientific classification
- Kingdom: Animalia
- Phylum: Mollusca
- Class: Gastropoda
- Order: Stylommatophora
- Family: Camaenidae
- Genus: Amphidromus
- Species: A. loricatus

Binomial name
- Amphidromus loricatus (L. Pfeiffer, 1855)

Synonyms
- Bulimus loricatus L. Pfeiffer, 1855

= Amphidromus loricatus =

Species of tree snail

Amphidromus loricatus is a species of air-breathing tree snail, an arboreal gastropod mollusk in the family Camaenidae.

== Description ==
The length of this shell attains 62 mm; its diameter 26 mm.

(Original description in Latin) The shell is sinistral and nearly imperforate, displaying an ovate-pyramidal shape and a solid structure. Its surface appears closely striated and whitish-tawny, exhibiting a marbling of brownish streaks and spots. The spire presents a convex-conical form with a somewhat acute apex. The shell contains seven to eight somewhat convex whorls. The body whorl measures almost three-quarters of the shell's length and is slightly malleated. The columella lies somewhat vertically and is slightly folded above. The aperture is oblique and sinuate-semioval, showing a glossy, pale pink interior. The peristome is thickened and shortly expanded, presenting a white color with its margins joined by a thick, white callus. The outer lip appears somewhat sinuate, while the columellar margin is dilated, reflected, and somewhat adnate.

== Distribution ==
This species is endemic to Java, Indonesia.
