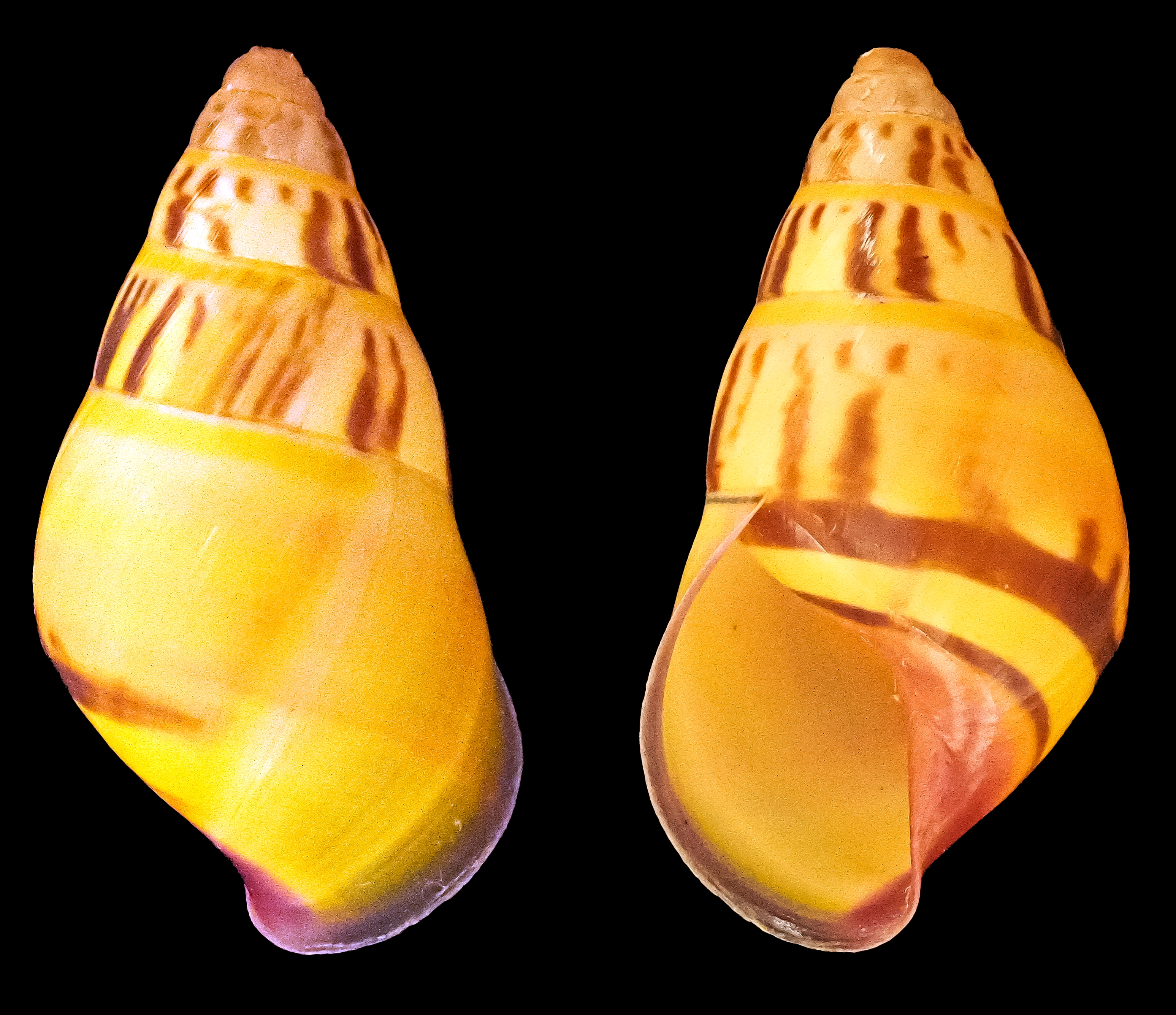
- Shell of Amphidromus herosae (holotype at the MNHN, Paris)

Scientific classification
- Kingdom: Animalia
- Phylum: Mollusca
- Class: Gastropoda
- Order: Stylommatophora
- Family: Camaenidae
- Genus: Amphidromus
- Species: A. herosae

Binomial name
- Amphidromus herosae Thach, 2021

= Amphidromus herosae =

Species of tree snail

Amphidromus herosae is a species of air-breathing tree snail, an arboreal gastropod mollusk in the family Camaenidae.

== Description ==
The length of this sinister shell attains 25.7 mm.

== Distribution ==
This species is endemic to Vietnam.
