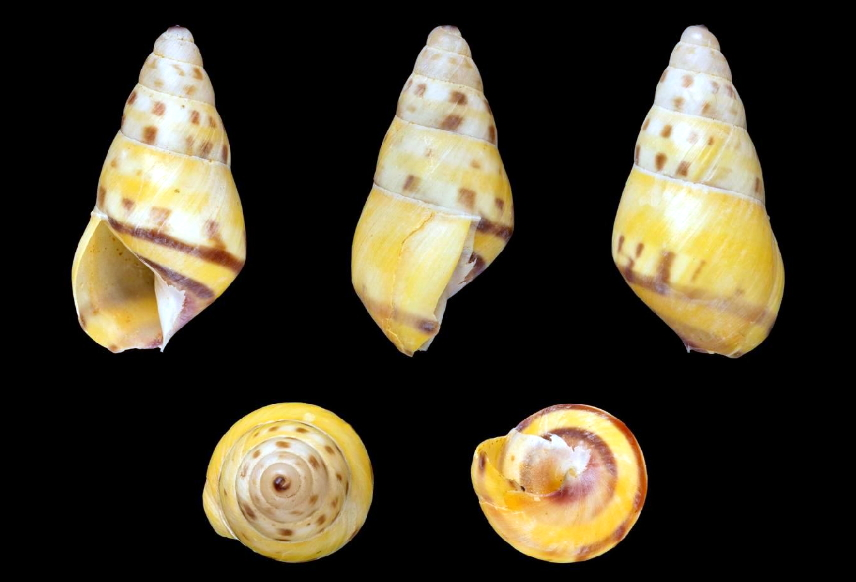
- Shell of Amphidromus frednaggsi (holotype at the Natural History Museum, London)

Scientific classification
- Domain: Eukaryota
- Kingdom: Animalia
- Phylum: Mollusca
- Class: Gastropoda
- Order: Stylommatophora
- Family: Camaenidae
- Genus: Amphidromus
- Species: A. frednaggsi

Binomial name
- Amphidromus frednaggsi Thach & F. Huber, 2018

= Amphidromus frednaggsi =

Species of snail in the family Camaenidae

Amphidromus frednaggsi is a species of medium-sized air-breathing tree snail, an arboreal gastropod mollusk in the family Camaenidae.

== Habitat ==
This species lives in trees.

== Distribution ==
The type locality of this species is Thailand.
