= Amphidromus pattinsonae =

Scientific classification
- Kingdom: Animalia
- Phylum: Mollusca
- Class: Gastropoda
- Order: Stylommatophora
- Family: Camaenidae
- Genus: Amphidromus
- Species: A. pattinsonae

Binomial name
- Amphidromus pattinsonae Iredale, 1943

Synonyms
- Amphidromus (Syndromus) pattinsonae Iredale, 1943 alternative representation

Species of tree snail

Amphidromus pattinsonae is a species of air-breathing tree snail, an arboreal gastropod mollusk in the family Camaenidae.

== Description ==
The length of the shell attains 28 mm, its diameter is 12.5 mm. The shell is sinistral, elongate, imperforate, smooth, and glossy.

== Distribution ==
This species is endemic to Myanmar.
