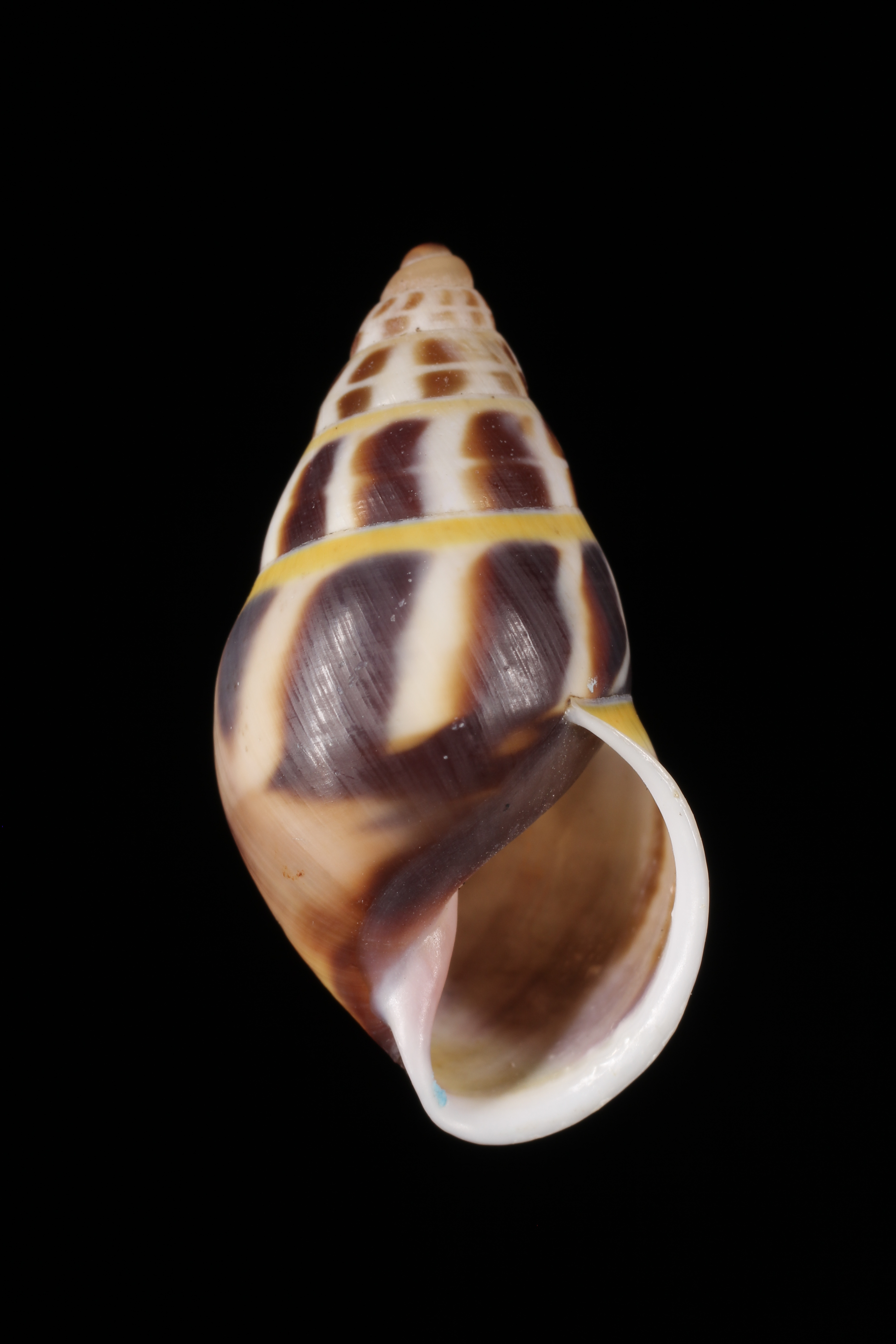
- Shell of Amphidromus loanphungae (holotype at MNHN, Paris)

Scientific classification
- Kingdom: Animalia
- Phylum: Mollusca
- Class: Gastropoda
- Order: Stylommatophora
- Family: Camaenidae
- Genus: Amphidromus
- Species: A. loanphungae

Binomial name
- Amphidromus loanphungae Thach, 2020

= Amphidromus loanphungae =

Species of tree snail

Amphidromus loanphungae is a species of air-breathing tree snail, an arboreal gastropod mollusk in the family Camaenidae.

== Description ==
The shell reaches 13.7 mm in length and is conical in shape. It is composed of approximately six convex whorls separated by a distinct suture. The shell surface bears fine growth lines and has a glossy appearance. Its ground color is white with brown axial stripes, producing a banded pattern characteristic of the species. The aperture is ovate, with a simple peristome, while the columella is nearly straight. The species is distinguished from related Amphidromus by its comparatively small size and unique shell color pattern as described in the original diagnosis.

== Distribution ==
This species is endemic to Vietnam. It is a tree snail, living in trees.
