= Amphidromus ingensoides =

Scientific classification
- Kingdom: Animalia
- Phylum: Mollusca
- Class: Gastropoda
- Order: Stylommatophora
- Family: Camaenidae
- Genus: Amphidromus
- Species: A. ingensoides

Binomial name
- Amphidromus ingensoides Jirapatrasilp & C.-T. Lee, 2024

Species of tree snail

Amphidromus ingensoides is a species of air-breathing tree snail, an arboreal gastropod mollusk in the family Camaenidae.

== Description ==
The length of the holotype attains 62.1 mm, its diameter 36.9 mm.

== Distribution ==
This chirally dimorphic (i.e. sinistral or dextral) species is endemic to Vietnam
