= Amphidromus mariani =

Scientific classification
- Kingdom: Animalia
- Phylum: Mollusca
- Class: Gastropoda
- Order: Stylommatophora
- Family: Camaenidae
- Genus: Amphidromus
- Species: A. mariani

Binomial name
- Amphidromus mariani Thach, 2024

Species of tree snail

Amphidromus mariani is a species of air-breathing tree snail, an arboreal gastropod mollusk in the family Camaenidae.

== Description ==
The length of this dextral shell attains 33 mm.

== Distribution ==
This species is endemic to Vietnam.
