= Amphidromus mingmini =

Scientific classification
- Domain: Eukaryota
- Kingdom: Animalia
- Phylum: Mollusca
- Class: Gastropoda
- Order: Stylommatophora
- Family: Camaenidae
- Genus: Amphidromus
- Species: A. mingmini

Binomial name
- Amphidromus mingmini Thach, 2019

Synonyms
- Amphidromus (Syndromus) mingmini Thach, 2019 alternative representation; Amphidromus berschaueri mingi Thach, 2019 (unnecessary replacement name for...); Amphidromus berschaueri mingmini Thach, 2019 (basionym)

Species of snail in the family Camaenidae

Amphidromus mingmini is a species of medium-sized air-breathing tree snail, an arboreal gastropod mollusk in the family Camaenidae.

== Habitat ==
This species lives in trees.

== Distribution ==
The type locality of this species is Timor Island.
