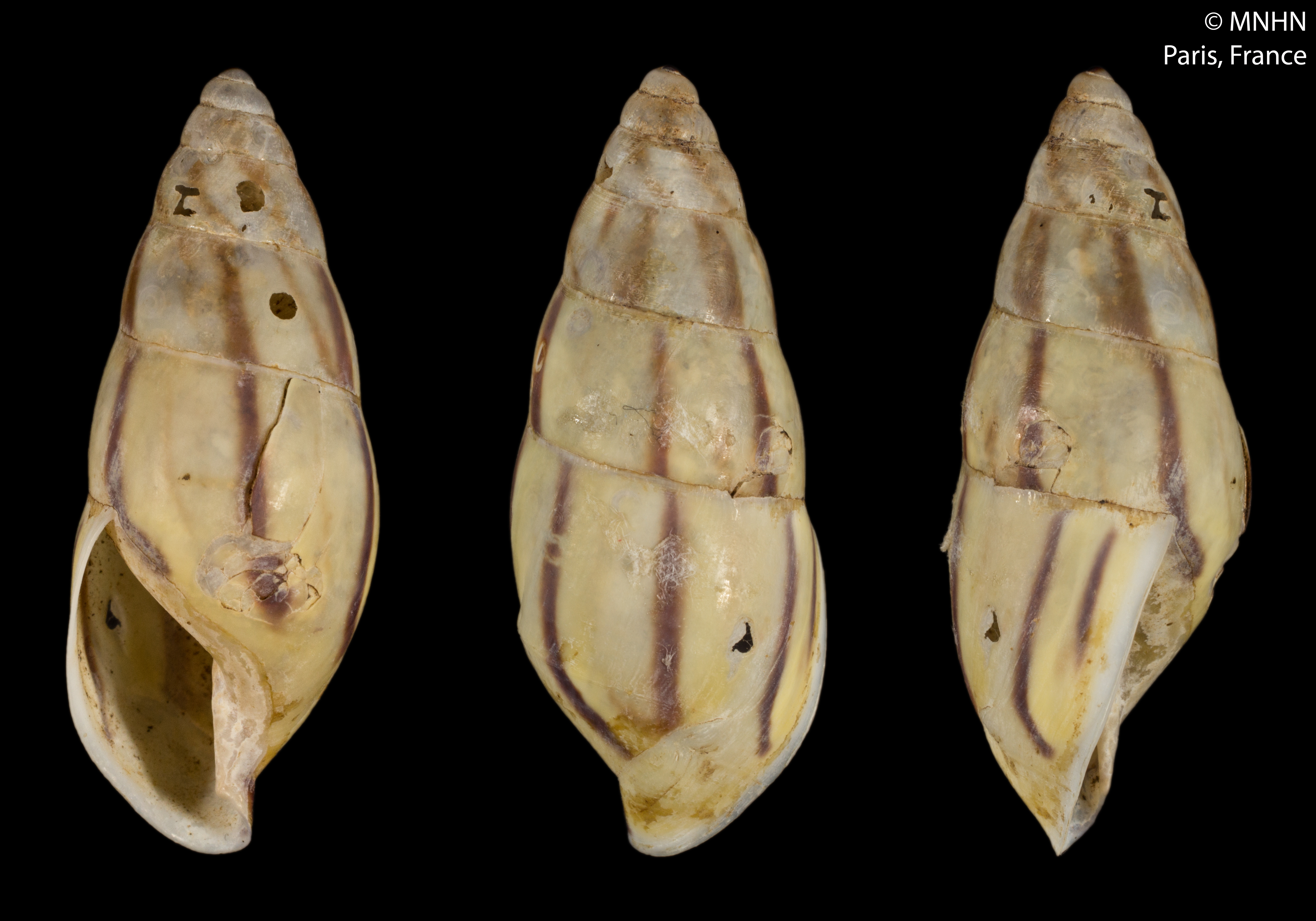
- Shell of Amphidromus mariasendersae (holotpye at MNHN, Paris)

Scientific classification
- Kingdom: Animalia
- Phylum: Mollusca
- Class: Gastropoda
- Order: Stylommatophora
- Family: Camaenidae
- Genus: Amphidromus
- Species: A. mariasendersae

Binomial name
- Amphidromus mariasendersae Thach & F. Huber, 2017

= Amphidromus mariasendersae =

Species of tree snail

Amphidromus mariasendersae is a species of air-breathing tree snail, an arboreal gastropod mollusk in the family Camaenidae.

== Description ==
The height of the shell attains 27.9 mm.

== Distribution ==
This species is endemic to Vietnam.
