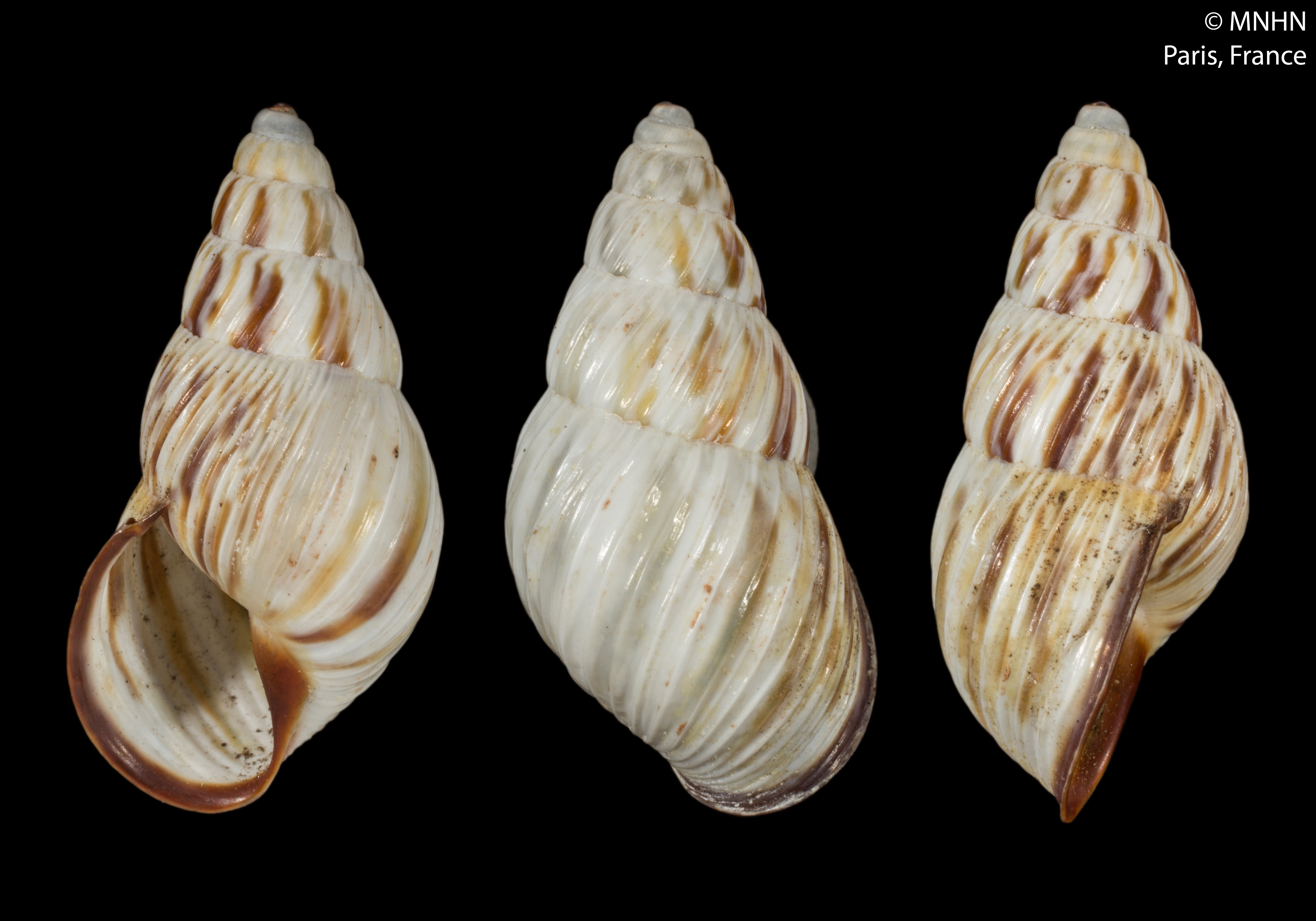
- Shell of Amphidromus begini (syntype at MNHN, Paris)

Scientific classification
- Kingdom: Animalia
- Phylum: Mollusca
- Class: Gastropoda
- Order: Stylommatophora
- Family: Camaenidae
- Genus: Amphidromus
- Species: A. begini

Binomial name
- Amphidromus begini (Morlet, 1886)

Synonyms
- Bulimus (Amphidromus) begini Morlet, 1886 (original combination)

= Amphidromus begini =

Species of snail in the family Camaenidae

Amphidromus begini is a species of medium-sized air-breathing tree snail, an arboreal gastropod mollusk in the family Camaenidae.

== Description ==
The length of the shell attains 25 mm, its diameter 13 mm.

(Original description in Latin) The thin, sinistral shell is rimulate, subfusiform and glossy. It is whitish, ornamented with irregular chestnut-brown flames and longitudinal riblets, occasionally bifurcating. The spire is elevated. The 6-7 convex whorls are separated by a subcrenulate suture. The three initial whorls are smooth, with a chestnut-black apex. The subsequent whorls are ribbed. The body whorl comprises two-thirds of the length. The aperture is basally subangular. The peristome is chestnut-brown, slightly thickened and reflected, its margins discontinuous with the columellar margin obscuring the umbilical rim.

== Habitat ==
This species lives in trees.

== Distribution ==
The type locality of this sinistral species is Cambodia.
