= Amphidromus zelosus =

Scientific classification
- Kingdom: Animalia
- Phylum: Mollusca
- Class: Gastropoda
- Order: Stylommatophora
- Family: Camaenidae
- Genus: Amphidromus
- Species: A. zelosus

Binomial name
- Amphidromus zelosus Y.-C. Wang & Z.-Y. Chen, 2021

Species of snail in the family Camaenidae

Amphidromus zelosus is a species of medium-sized air-breathing tree snail, an arboreal gastropod mollusk in the family Camaenidae.

== Description ==
The length of the shell attains 30.25 mm, its diameter 21.2 mm.

== Habitat ==
This species lives in trees.

== Distribution ==
The type locality of this species is Guangxi, China.
