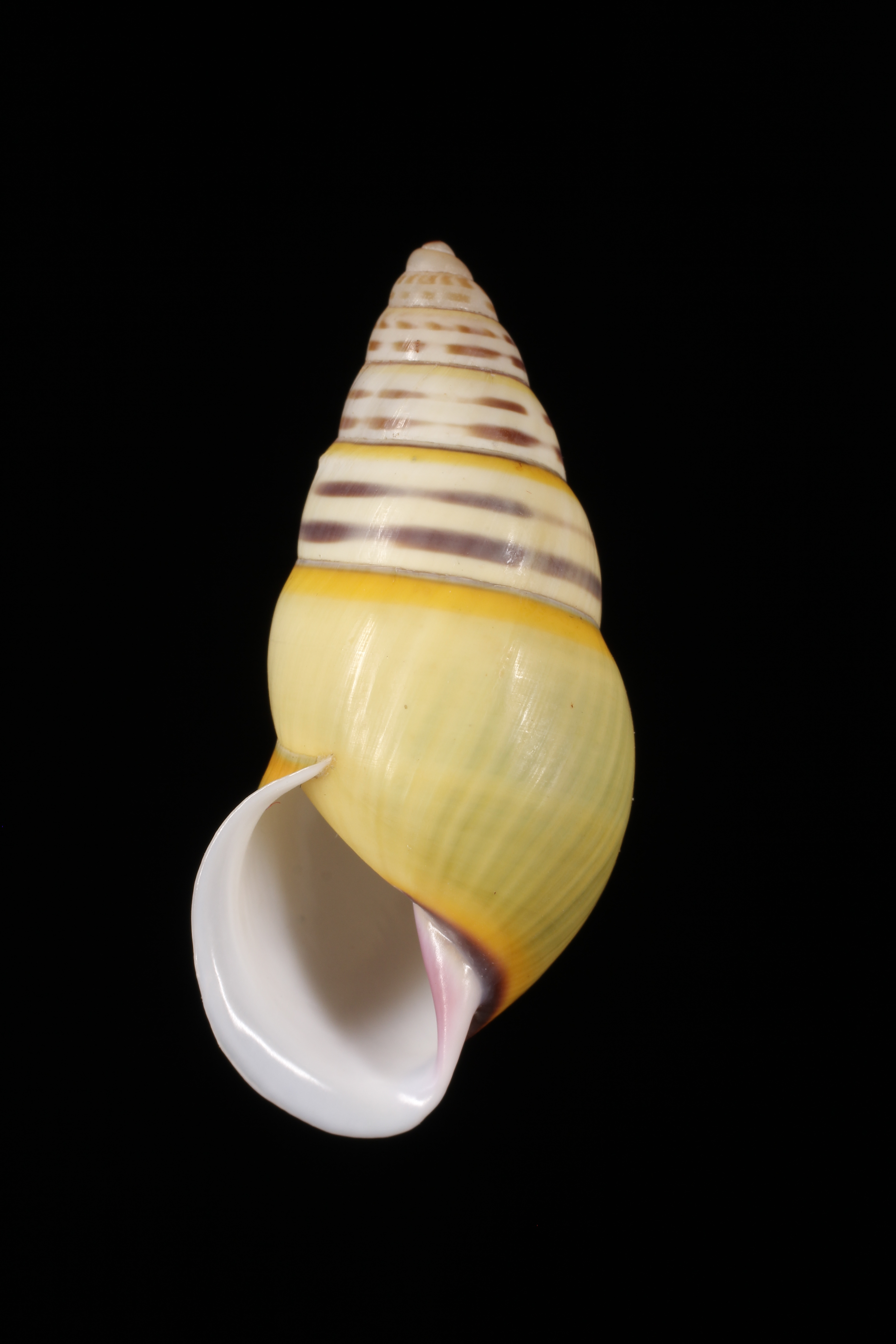
- Shell of Amphidromus boroni (holotype at MNHN, Paris)

Scientific classification
- Kingdom: Animalia
- Phylum: Mollusca
- Class: Gastropoda
- Order: Stylommatophora
- Family: Camaenidae
- Genus: Amphidromus
- Species: A. boroni

Binomial name
- Amphidromus boroni Thach, 2020

= Amphidromus boroni =

Species of tree snail

Amphidromus boroni is a species of air-breathing tree snail, an arboreal gastropod mollusk in the family Camaenidae.

== Description ==
The length of this sinister shell attains 35.7 mm;

== Distribution ==
This species is endemic to Vietnam.
