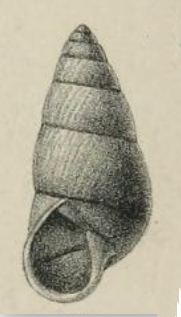
- Shell of Amphidromus hosei

Scientific classification
- Kingdom: Animalia
- Phylum: Mollusca
- Class: Gastropoda
- Order: Stylommatophora
- Family: Camaenidae
- Genus: Amphidromus
- Species: A. hosei

Binomial name
- Amphidromus hosei E. A. Smith, 1895

= Amphidromus hosei =

Species of snail in the family Camaenidae

Amphidromus hosei is a species of medium-sized air-breathing tree snail, an arboreal gastropod mollusk in the family Camaenidae.

This is a taxon inquirendum.

== Description ==
The shell is small, rimate, sinistral, elongate, and conic, featuring a narrow reddish-purple line that encircles the middle of the body whorl and appears above the suture. Towards the apex, it is spotted with brown under a very thin pale yellow cuticle. Comprising seven a little convex whorls that are striated with very delicate, oblique growth-lines and increase slowly and regularly, the body whorl is short and stained with black around the narrow umbilical chink. The aperture is inverted auriform and pale yellowish with a median reddish-purple line, slightly exceeding one-third the total length of the shell. The peristome is white, narrowly expanded and reflexed, with the columellar margin being thickened and narrowly dilated.

== Habitat ==
This species lives in trees.

== Distribution ==
The type locality of this species is Sarawak, East Malaysia.
