= Amphidromus friedahuberae =

Scientific classification
- Kingdom: Animalia
- Phylum: Mollusca
- Class: Gastropoda
- Order: Stylommatophora
- Family: Camaenidae
- Genus: Amphidromus
- Species: A. friedahuberae

Binomial name
- Amphidromus friedahuberae Thach & F. Huber, 2017

Synonyms
- Amphidromus (Amphidromus) friedahuberae Thach & F. Huber, 2017 alternative representation

Species of tree snail

Amphidromus friedahuberae is a species of air-breathing tree snail, an arboreal gastropod mollusk in the family Camaenidae.

The holotype is in the Natural History Museum, London.

== Distribution ==
This species is endemic to Vietnam
