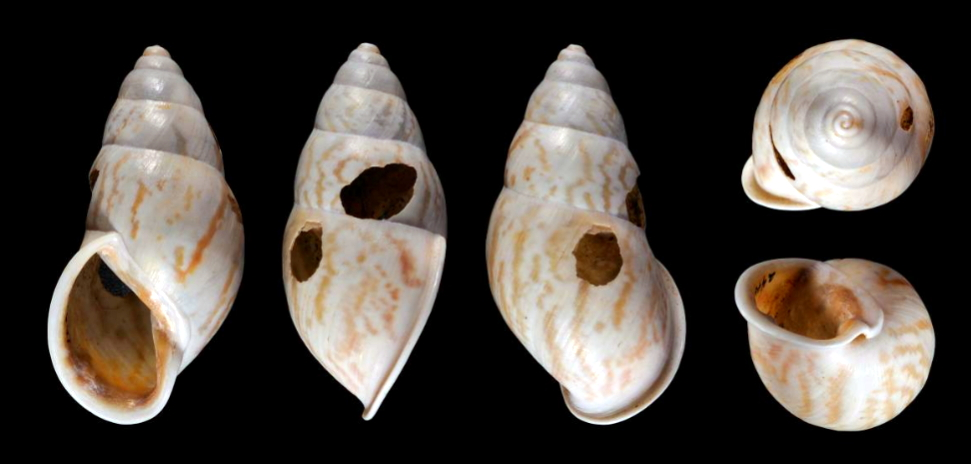
- Shell of Amphidromus basilanensis (holotype at the Smithsonian Institution)

Scientific classification
- Kingdom: Animalia
- Phylum: Mollusca
- Class: Gastropoda
- Order: Stylommatophora
- Family: Camaenidae
- Genus: Amphidromus
- Species: A. basilanensis

Binomial name
- Amphidromus basilanensis Bartsch, 1917

= Amphidromus basilanensis =

Species of tree snail

Amphidromus basilanensis is a species of air-breathing tree snail, an arboreal gastropod mollusk in the family Camaenidae.

== Description ==
The length of the shell attains 45.8 mm; its diameter 24.2 mm

(Original description) The medium-sized shell is elongate-ovate. The initial three whorls are dull white with a satiny sheen, transitioning to the same base color on subsequent whorls, which are irregularly marked with discontinuous, light brown axial zigzag lines. These markings, lacking a consistent pattern, become more prevalent on the body whorl. The whorls are moderately rounded and appressed at the apex. They exhibit fine, strongly retractive axial growth lines and extremely fine spiral striations. The sutures are moderately constricted. The aperture is moderately large, oval, with a thickened and reflected outer lip. The inner lip is thickened, slightly sinuous, and reflects over the umbilical chink. The parietal wall bears a moderately thick callus. The aperture's interior coloration mirrors the exterior, with the brown markings permeating the shell. The peristome's outer edge is white, while its inner border displays the same brown as the axial bands.

== Distribution ==
This sinistral species is endemic to Basilan Island, the Philippines.
