= Tree snail =

Common name of several tree-dwelling snails

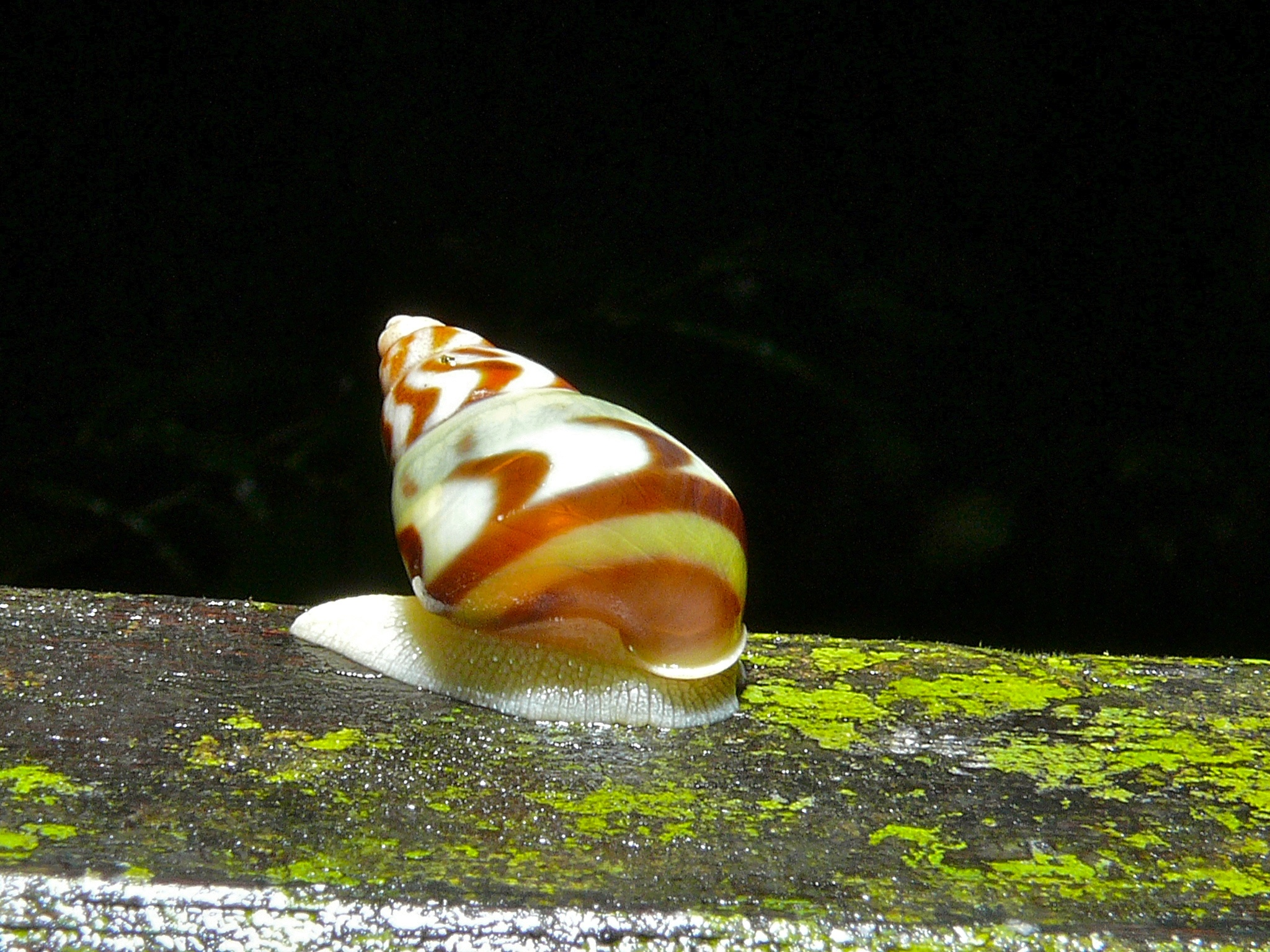
Amphidromus adamsii

Tree snail is a common name that is applied to various kinds of tropical air-breathing land snails, pulmonate gastropod mollusks that have shells, and that live in trees, in other words, are exclusively arboreal in habitat.

Some other species of air-breathing land snails may sometimes be found on tree trunks, or even in the foliage of trees, but this does not mean they live their whole lives in trees, and they are not considered to be tree snails.

== Tree snail ==
Genera and species that have the words "tree snail" as a part of their common name include:

- genus Achatinella (Oahu tree snails) - Oahu
- genus Partula (Polynesian tree snails) - Pacific
- genus Samoana (Samoan tree snails) - Polynesia plus one species in Guam.
- genus Eua
  - Eua zebrina - Tutuila tree snail
- genus Drymaeus
  - Drymaeus dominicus (Reeve, 1850) - master treesnail
  - Drymaeus dormani (W. G. Binney, 1857) - manatee treesnail
  - Drymaeus multilineatus (Say, 1825) - lined treesnail
- genus Orthalicus (not all species)
  - Orthalicus reses - the Stock Island treesnail
    - Orthalicus reses nesodryas - Florida Keys treesnail
  - Orthalicus floridensis - banded treesnail
- genus Amphidromus
  - Amphidromus asper - large-sized air-breathing tree snail
  - Amphidromus atricallosus - callose tree snail
  - Amphidromus perversus - perverse tree snail
- genus Liguus (not all species)
  - Liguus fasciatus (Müller, 1774) - Florida treesnail
- genus Papustyla (not all species)
  - Papustyla pulcherrima - emerald green snail, or green tree snail, or manus green tree snail

== See also ==
- Arboreal locomotion
- Polynesian tree snail
