= List of Amphidromus species =

There are over 270 species within the land snail genus Amphidromus.. The precise number is subject to change due to ongoing taxonomic revisions

These species used to be divided into three subgenera:, They are all accepted as an alternate representation

- subgenus Amphidromus Albers, 1850
- subgenus Goniodromus Bülow, 1905: The shell closely resembles that of Amphidromus, differing primarily in the aperture: rather than being uniformly rounded, the extension of the columella forms an angular spout with the anterior lip, analogous to the siphonal canal found in marine gastropods.
- subgenus Syndromus Pilsbry, 1900: all species of the subgenus Syndromus are sinistral with two exceptions: amphidromine Amphidromus glaucolarynx and dextral Amphidromus kuehni.
- Amphidromus abbasi Chan & Tan, 2010
- Amphidromus abbasorum Thach, 2017
- Amphidromus abbotthuberorum Thach, 2017
- Amphidromus adamsii (Reeve, 1848)
- Amphidromus agnieszkae Thach, 2020
- Amphidromus alfi Thach, 2020
- Amphidromus alicetandiasae Parsons, 2016
- Amphidromus alicjaboronae Thach, 2021
- Amphidromus alticola Fulton, 1896
- Amphidromus ameliae Dharma, 2007
- Amphidromus andamanicus (Hanley & Theobald, 1876)
- Amphidromus angulatus Fulton, 1896
- Amphidromus anhdaoorum Thach, 2017
- Amphidromus anhduongae Thach, 2020
- Amphidromus annae E. von Martens, 1891
- Amphidromus anthonyabbotti Thach & F. Huber, 2017
- Amphidromus areolatus (Pfeiffer, 1861)
- Amphidromus arlingi Thach, 2017
- Amphidromus asperoides Jirapatrasilp & C.-T. Lee, 2024
- Amphidromus atricallosus (Gould, 1843)
- Amphidromus aureocinctus Fulton, 1896
- Amphidromus backeljaui Thach, 2020
- Amphidromus baili Thach, 2020
- Amphidromus banksi Butot, 1955
- Amphidromus baoi Thach, 2017
- Amphidromus baolocensis Thach & F. Huber, 2016
- Amphidromus basilanensis Bartsch, 1917
- Amphidromus bataviae (Grateloup, 1840)
- Amphidromus beccarii (Tapparone Canefri, 1883)
- Amphidromus begini (Morlet, 1886)
- Amphidromus bernardfamyi Thach, 2017
- Amphidromus binhduongensis Thach & F. Huber, 2021
- Amphidromus binhphuocensis Thach, 2019
- Amphidromus boroni Thach, 2020
- Amphidromus bozhii Y.C. Wang, 2019
- Amphidromus bramvanderbijli Thach, 2019
- Amphidromus buelowi Fruhstorfer, 1905
- Amphidromus buluanensis Bartsch, 1917
- Amphidromus cambojiensis (Reeve, 1860)
- Amphidromus capistratus E. von Martens, 1903
- Amphidromus centrocelebensis Bollinger, 1918
- Amphidromus chengweii Thach, 2023
- Amphidromus cochinchinensis (Pfeiffer, 1857)
- Amphidromus coeruleus Clench & Archer, 1932
- Amphidromus cognatus Fulton, 1907
- Amphidromus columellaris Möllendorff, 1892
- Amphidromus comes (Pfeiffer, 1861)
- Amphidromus consobrinus Fulton, 1897
- Amphidromus contrarius (O.F. Müller, 1774) - the type species of the subgenus Syndromus
- Amphidromus cossignanii Thach, 2021
- Amphidromus costiferE. A. Smith, 1893
- Amphidromus crassus Fulton, 1899
- Amphidromus cruentatus (Morelet, 1875)
- Amphidromus dambriensis Thach & F. Huber, 2016 (taxon inquirendum, debated synonym)
- Amphidromus dancei Dharma, 2021
- Amphidromus daoae Thach, 2016
- Amphidromus dautzenbergi Fulton, 1899
- Amphidromus davidberschaueri Thach, 2021
- Amphidromus dekkeri Thach, 2021
- Amphidromus delsaerdti Thach, 2016
- Amphidromus djajasasmitai Dharma, 1993
- Amphidromus dohrni (L. Pfeiffer, 1864)
- Amphidromus donchani Thach, 2019
- Amphidromus dubius Fulton, 1896
- Amphidromus duboismercesylviae Thach & F. Huber, 2020
- Amphidromus dungae Thach, 2021
- Amphidromus elviae Dharma, 2007
- Amphidromus elvinae Dharma, 2007
- Amphidromus enganoensis Fulton, 1896
- Amphidromus entobaptus Dohrn, 1889
- Amphidromus epidemiae Y.-C. Wang, 2021
- Amphidromus escondidus Poppe, 2020
- Amphidromus eudeli Ancey, 1897 (taxon inquirendum, debated synonym)
- Amphidromus everetti Fulton, 1896
- Amphidromus feliciae Thach & Abbas, 2020
- Amphidromus felixi Dharma, 2021
- Amphidromus fengae Y.C. Wang, 2019
- Amphidromus filozonatus (E. von Martens, 1867)
- Amphidromus flavus (L. Pfeiffer, 1861)
- Amphidromus floresianus Fulton, 1897
- Amphidromus frednaggsi Thach & F. Huber, 2018
- Amphidromus friedahuberae Thach & F. Huber, 2017
- Amphidromus fultoni Ancey, 1897
- Amphidromus furcillatus (Mousson, 1849)
- Amphidromus gattingeri Thach & F. Huber, 2020
- Amphidromus gerberi Thach & F. Huber, 2017 (taxon inquirendum, debated synonym)
- Amphidromus gisellelieae Thach & Abbas, 2022
- Amphidromus givenchyi Geret, 1912
- Amphidromus glaucolarynx (Dohrn, 1861)
- Amphidromus globonevilli Sutcharit & Panha, 2015
- Amphidromus grohi Thach, 2021
- Amphidromus gustafi Thach & F. Huber, 2020
- Amphidromus haematostoma Möllendorff, 1898
- Amphidromus hamatus Fulton, 1896
- Amphidromus harryleei Thach, 2020
- Amphidromus hassi Thach & F. Huber, 2018 (taxon inquirendum, debated synonym)
- Amphidromus haszprunari Thach, 2020
- Amphidromus heerianus (L. Pfeiffer, 1871)
- Amphidromus heinrichhuberi Thach & F. Huber, 2016
- Amphidromus hejingi Thach, 2019
- Amphidromus herosae Thach, 2021
- Amphidromus hildagoi Bartsch, 1917
- Amphidromus hongdaoae Thach, 2017
- Amphidromus hosei E. A. Smith, 1895 (taxon inquirendum)
- Amphidromus huanganhi Thach, 2020
- Amphidromus huberi Thach, 2014
- Amphidromus huynhanhi Thach, 2019
- Amphidromus huynhi Thach, 2019
- Amphidromus ilsa B. Rensch, 1933
- Amphidromus inconstans Fulton, 1898
- Amphidromus inflatus Fulton, 1896
- Amphidromus ingens Möllendorff, 1900
- Amphidromus ingensoides Jirapatrasilp & C.-T. Lee, 2024
- Amphidromus inversus (Müller, 1774)
- Amphidromus iunior Cilia, 2013
- Amphidromus jacobsoni Laidlaw, 1954
- Amphidromus jadeni Thach, 2021
- Amphidromus janus (L. Pfeiffer, 1854)
- Amphidromus javanicus (G.B. Sowerby I, 1833)
- Amphidromus jeffabbasorum Thach, 2016
- Amphidromus jomi Dumrongrojwattana, Wongkamhaeng & Tanamai, 2019
- Amphidromus jonabletti Thach, 2019
- Amphidromus juliekeppensae Thach, 2021
- Amphidromus kalaoensis Fulton, 1896
- Amphidromus kantori Thach & F. Huber, 2020
- Amphidromus keppensdhondtorum Thach, 2018
- Amphidromus khammouanensis Thach & F. Huber, 2017
- Amphidromus khoatuanorum Thach, 2021
- Amphidromus kiati Thach, 2020
- Amphidromus koenigi Thach & F. Huber, 2018
- Amphidromus koonpoi Thach & F. Huber, 2018 (taxon inquirendum - debated synonym)
- Amphidromus kruijti P. Sarasin & S. Sarasin, 1899
- Amphidromus kuehni Möllendorff, 1902

- This is the only dextral species in the subgenus Syndromus.

- Amphidromus kvuongi Segers, 2023
- Amphidromus laevus (O. F. Müller, 1774)
- Amphidromus laii Thach, 2019
- Amphidromus laosianus Bavay, 1898
- Amphidromus latestrigatus M.M. Schepman, 1892
- Amphidromus ledaoae Thach, 2016
- Amphidromus leeanus Thach, 2021
- Amphidromus lepidus (Gould, 1856)
- Amphidromus leucoxanthus (E. von Martens, 1864)
- Amphidromus liei Thach, 2017
- Amphidromus lilianaboronae Thach, 2021
- Amphidromus lindstedti (L. Pfeiffer, 1857)
- Amphidromus loanphungae Thach, 2020
- Amphidromus loricatus (L. Pfeiffer, 1855)
- Amphidromus luangensis Gra-tes, 2015
- Amphidromus maculatus Fulton, 1896
- Amphidromus maculiferus (G. B. Sowerby I, 1838)
- Amphidromus madelineae Thach, 2020
- Amphidromus marekboroni Thach, 2021
- Amphidromus mariaeThach & F. Huber, 2017
- Amphidromus mariani Thach, 2024
- Amphidromus mariasendersae Thach & F. Huber, 2017
- Amphidromus marki Thach, 2021
- Amphidromus markpankowskii Thach, 2020
- Amphidromus martensi Boettger, 1894
- Amphidromus maryae Thach, 2021
- Amphidromus masoni (Godwin-Austen, 1876)
- Amphidromus maxi Thach, 2020
- Amphidromus melanomma (L. Pfeiffer, 1852)
- Amphidromus melindae Thach, 2023
- Amphidromus metabletus Möllendorf, 1900
- Amphidromus mindoroensis Bartsch, 1917 (taxon inquirendum)
- Amphidromus mingmini Thach, 2019
- Amphidromus minhthaoae Thach, 2020
- Amphidromus mirandus Bavay & Dautzenberg, 1912
- Amphidromus moniliferus (Gould, 1846)
- Amphidromus monsecourorum Thach & F. Huber, 2017
- Amphidromus mouhoti (Pfeiffer, 1861)
- Amphidromus multicolor Möllendorff, 1893
- Amphidromus mundus (L. Pfeiffer, 1853)
- Amphidromus ngai Thach, 2019
- Amphidromus nganguyeni Thach, 2021
- Amphidromus ngocae Thach, 2021
- Amphidromus ngocanhi Thach, 2017
- Amphidromus nguyetminhae Thach, 2020
- Amphidromus niasensis Fulton, 1907
- Amphidromus nicoasiarum Thach, 2021
- Amphidromus nicoi Thach, 2017
- Amphidromus noviae Thach, 2024
- Amphidromus palaceus (Mousson, 1848)
- Amphidromus pankowskianus Thach, 2020
- Amphidromus pankowskiorum Thach, 2021
- Amphidromus parsonsi Thach, Abbas & Lie, 2024
- Amphidromus patbaili Thach & F. Huber, 2021
- Amphidromus pattinsonae Iredale, 1943
- Amphidromus perrieri A. de Rochebrune, 1882 (taxon inquirendum, usage in recent literature undocumented)
- Amphidromus persimilis J. Parsons, 2019
- Amphidromus perversus (Linnaeus, 1758) - the type species of the genus Amphidromus
- Amphidromus petestimpsoni Thach, 2021
- Amphidromus phamanhi Thach, 2016
- Amphidromus phamanhorum Thach, 2021: (taxon inquirendum, debated synonym)
- Amphidromus phamtuanhae Thach, 2021
- Amphidromus phamvutuanhae Thach, 2022
- Amphidromus philippeboucheti Thach, 2019
- Amphidromus pictus Fulton, 1896
- Amphidromus pisororum Thach, 2023
- Amphidromus placidus Fulton, 1896
- Amphidromus placostylus Möllendorff, 1900
- Amphidromus poecilochroa Fulton, 1896
- Amphidromus poppei Thach, 2020
- Amphidromus porcellanus (Mousson, 1849)
- Amphidromus principalis Sutcharit & Panha, 2015
- Amphidromus protania Lehmann & Maassen, 2004
- Amphidromus psephos Vermeulen, T.-S. Liew & Schilthuizen, 2015
- Amphidromus puspae Dharma, 1993
- Amphidromus qiongensis J. He & Q.-H. Zhou, 2017
- Amphidromus quadrasi Hidalgo, 1887
- Amphidromus quangtrungi Thach, 2021
- Amphidromus reflexilabris Schepman, 1892
- Amphidromus reuselaarsi Thach, 2018
- Amphidromus rhodostylus Möllendorff, 1901
- Amphidromus richardi Severns, 2006
- Amphidromus ristiae Dharma, 2007
- Amphidromus robustus Fulton, 1896
- Amphidromus roeseleri Möllendorff, 1894
- Amphidromus rosalindae Thach & Abbas, 2023
- Amphidromus roseolabiatus Fulton, 1896
- Amphidromus rottiensis Chan & Tan, 2010
- Amphidromus sancangensis Dharma, 2007
- Amphidromus sandersae Thach & F. Huber, 2020
- Amphidromus schomburgki (Pfeiffer, 1860)
- Amphidromus sekincauensis Dharma, 2007
- Amphidromus semifrenatus E. von Martens, 1900
- Amphidromus semitessellatus (Morlet, 1884)
- Amphidromus setzeri Thach, 2015 (taxon inquirendum)
- Amphidromus severnsi Thach, 2017 (taxon inquirendum, debated synonym)
- Amphidromus similis Pilsbry, 1900
- Amphidromus simonei Thach, 2020
- Amphidromus sinensis (Benson, 1851)
- Amphidromus singalangensis Rolle, 1908
- Amphidromus sinistralis (Reeve, 1849)
- Amphidromus siongkiati Thach, 2019
- Amphidromus smithii Fulton, 1896
- Amphidromus sowerbyi Fulton, 1907
- Amphidromus sowyani Thach, 2019
- Amphidromus sriabbasae Thach, 2017
- Amphidromus stevenliei Parsons, 2016
- Amphidromus stungtrengensis Thach & F. Huber, 2018
- Amphidromus sulphuratus (Hombron & Jacquinot, 1847)
- Amphidromus suluensis Bartsch, 1917
- Amphidromus sumatranus (E. von Martens, 1864)
- Amphidromus sumbaensis Fulton, 1896
- Amphidromus suspectus (E. von Martens, 1864)
- Amphidromus sylheticus (Reeve, 1849)
- Amphidromus sylviae Stark, 2017
- Amphidromus syndromoideus Inkhavilay & Panha, 2017
- Amphidromus szekeresi Thach, 2020
- Amphidromus taluensis Gra-tes, 2015
- Amphidromus tandiasae Thach & Abbas, 2023
- Amphidromus tanyai Panha, 1997
- Amphidromus thachi F. Huber, 2015
- Amphidromus thachorum F. Huber, 2020
- Amphidromus thaitieni Thach & F. Huber, 2020
- Amphidromus thalassochromus Vermeulen & Junau, 2007
- Amphidromus thomasi Thach, 2021: (taxon inquirendum, debated synonym)
- Amphidromus thuthaoae Thach, 2021
- Amphidromus timorensis Parsons & Abbas, 2020
- Amphidromus trianensis Thach & F. Huber, 2018
- Amphidromus truongi Thach, 2021
- Amphidromus tuanhae Thach, 2021
- Amphidromus tuani Thach, 2021
- Amphidromus tureki Thach, 2021
- † Amphidromus ubaldii Dharma, 2021
- Amphidromus verbinneni Segers, 2020
- Amphidromus vincekessneri Thach, 2020
- Amphidromus walleri Thach, 2020
- Amphidromus webbi Fulton, 1907
- Amphidromus winteri (L. Pfeiffer, 1849)
- Amphidromus xiaoxiaoi Y.-C. Wang & J. Parsons, 2022
- Amphidromus xiengensis Morlet, 1891
- Amphidromus xiongxiaoxiaoi Y.-C. Wang, 2023
- Amphidromus yangbayensis Thach & F. Huber, 2016
- Amphidromus yauyeejiae Thach & Abbas, 2017
- Amphidromus yenlinhae Thach & F. Huber, 2017
- Amphidromus zebrinus (L. Pfeiffer, 1861)
- Amphidromus zelosus Y.-C. Wang & Z.-Y. Chen, 2021
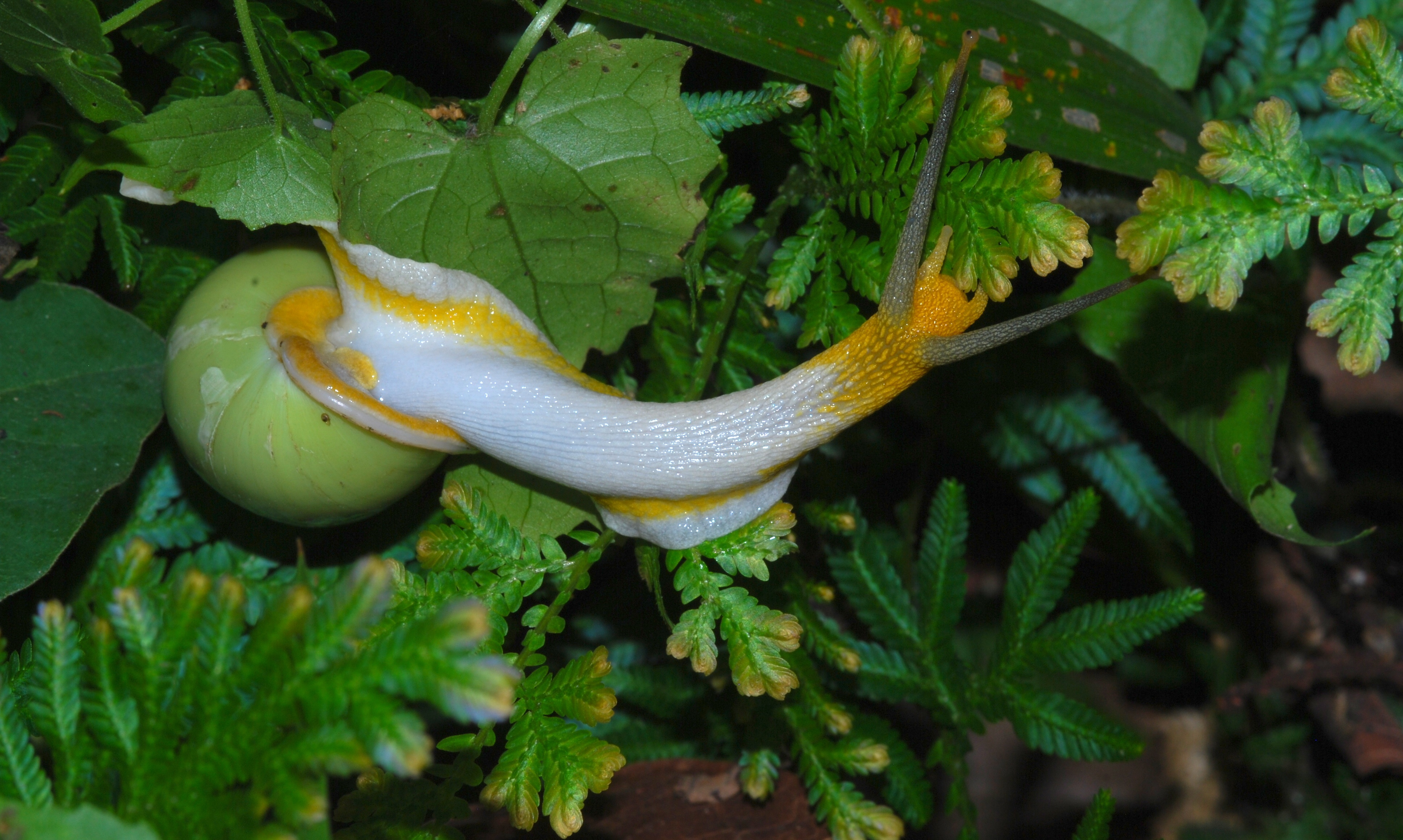
Amphidromus atricallosus perakensis

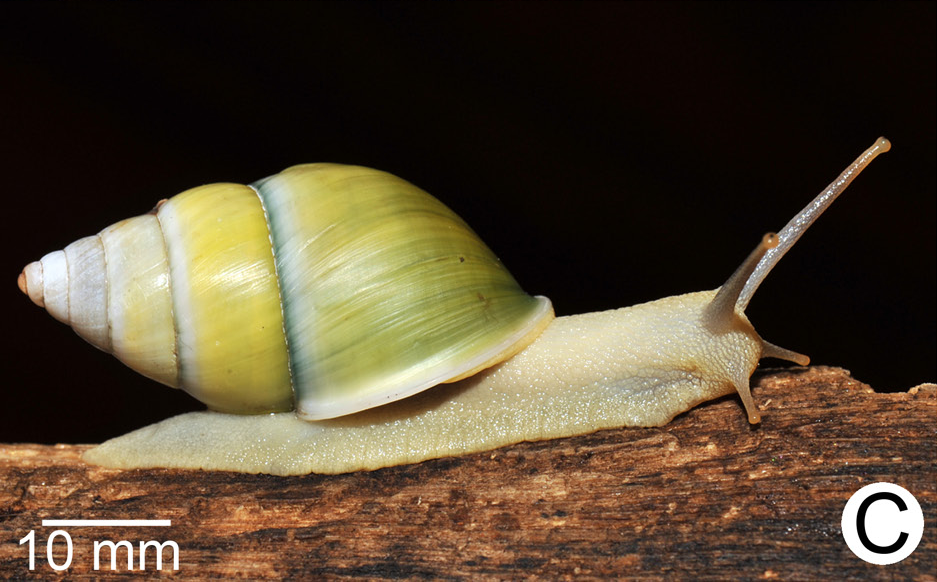
Amphidromus givenchyi

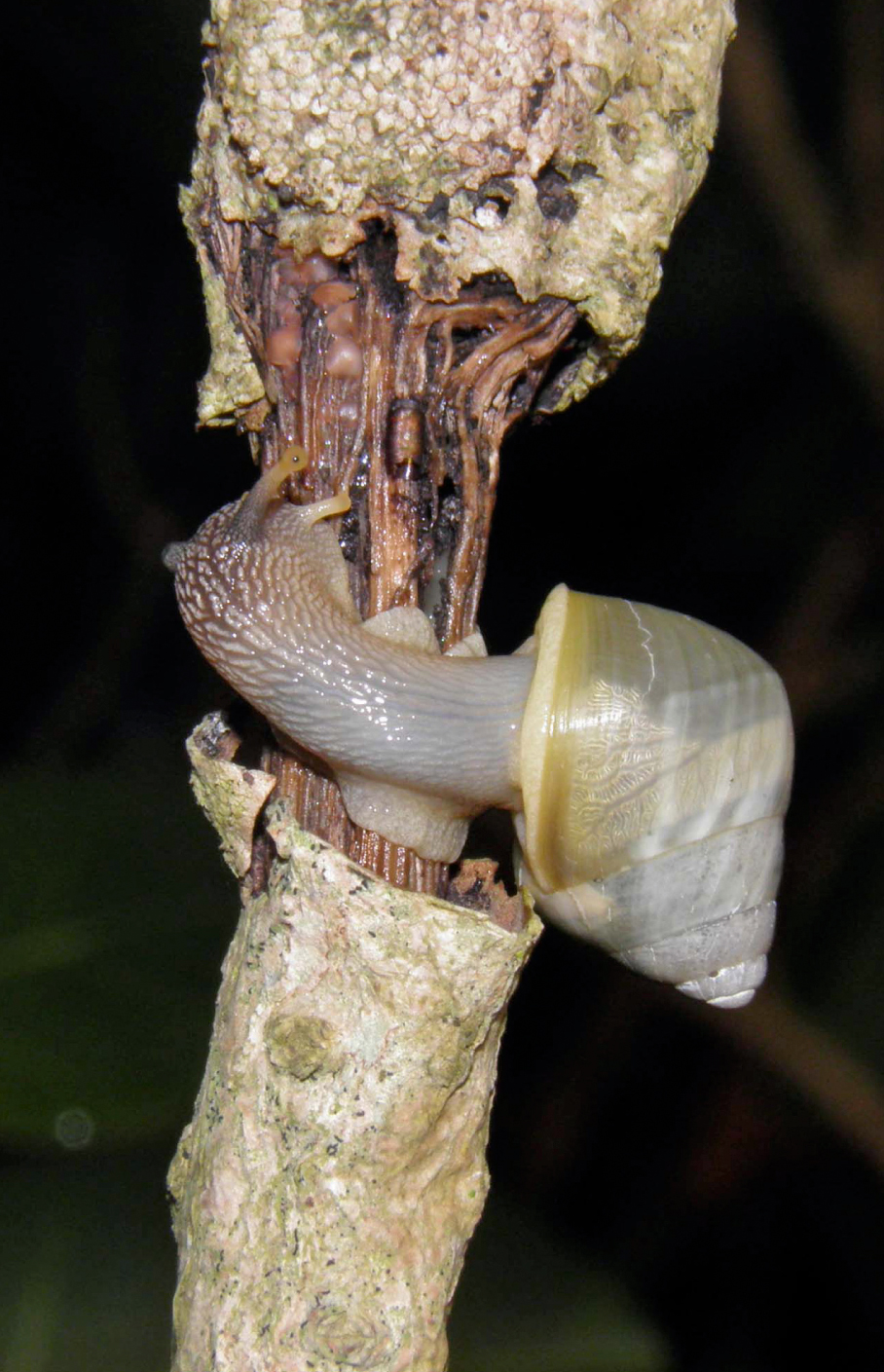
Amphidromus inversus

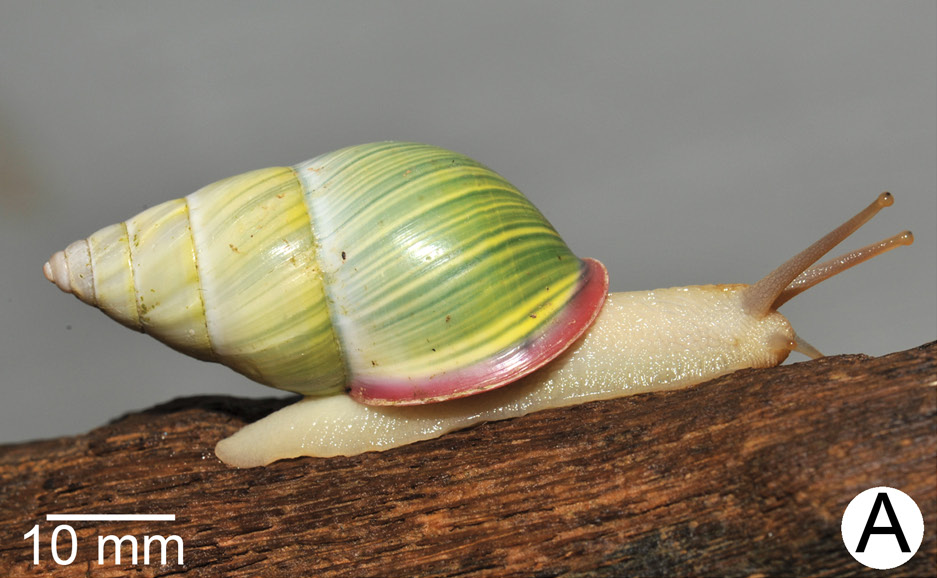
Amphidromus roseolabiatus

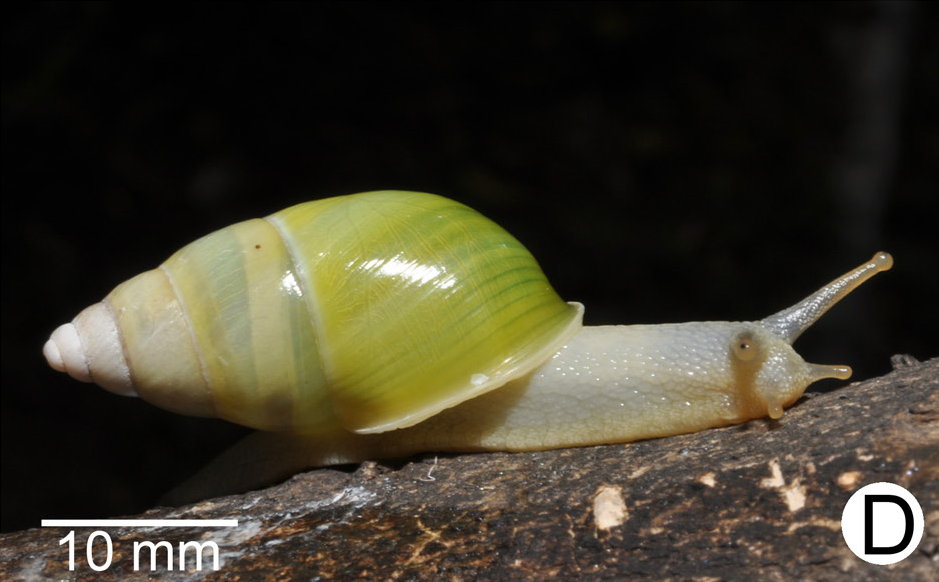
Amphidromus syndromoideus

== Subgenus Syndromus ==
subgenus Syndromus Pilsbry, 1900

All species of the subgenus Syndromus are sinistral with two exceptions: amphidromine Amphidromus glaucolarynx and dextral Amphidromus kuehni.

- Amphidromus glaucolarynx (Dohrn, 1861) - This is the only one amphidromine (left-handed and right-handed snails occur in the population) species in the subgenus Syndromus.
- Amphidromus xiengkhaungensis Inkhavilay & Panha, 2017
- Amphidromus sp. - an undescribed species from Lampung, Indonesia
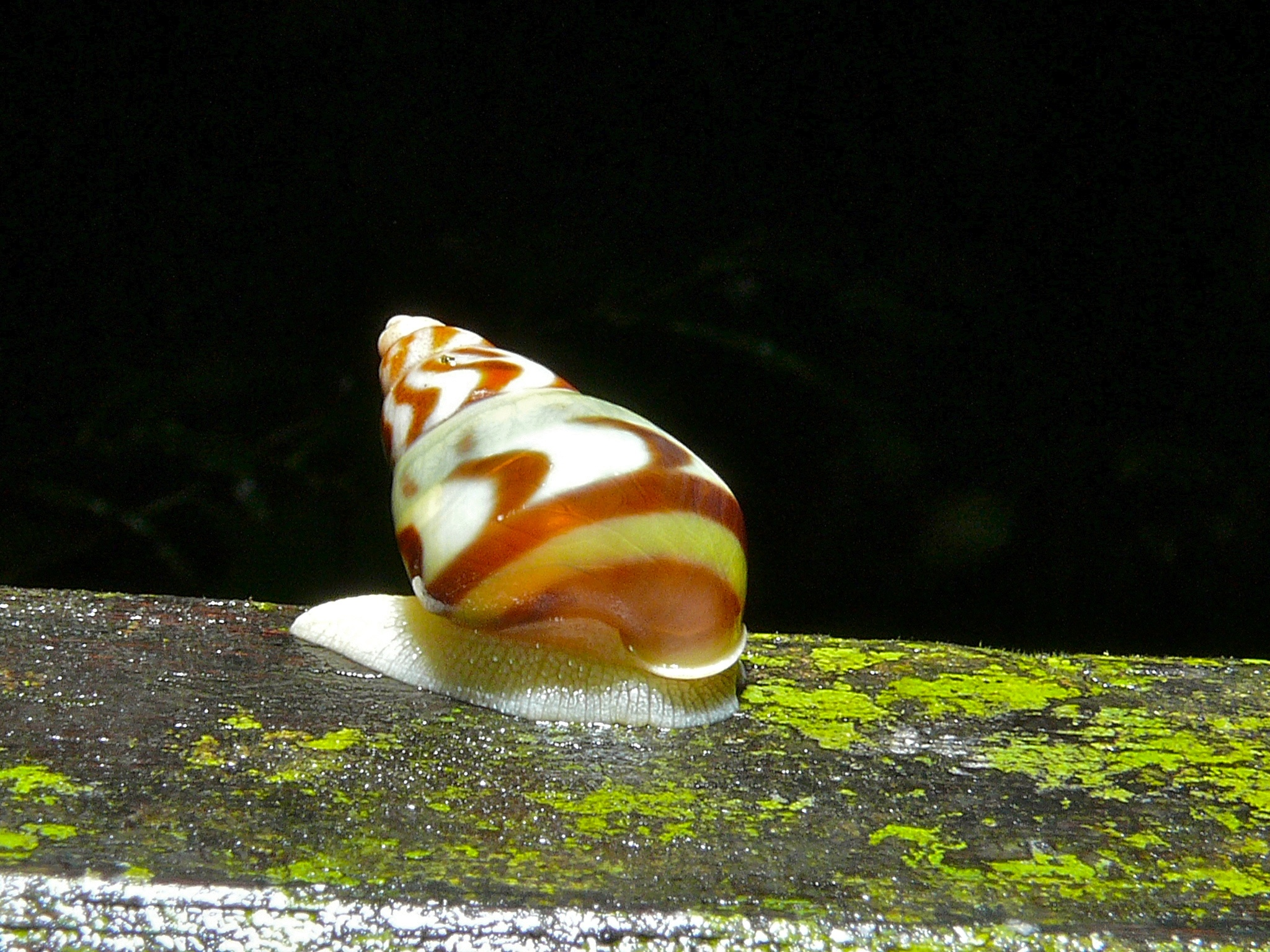
Amphidromus adamsii

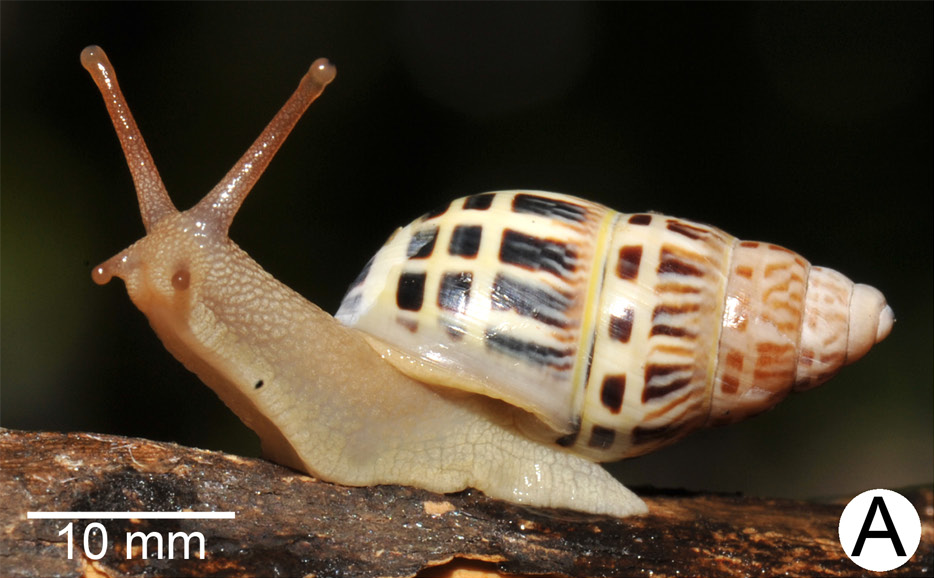
Amphidromus areolatus

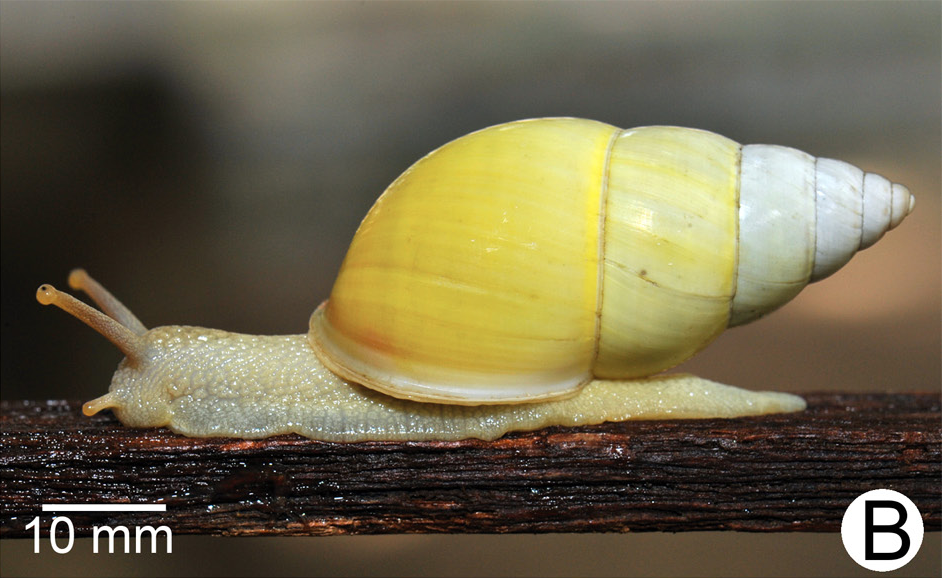
Amphidromus flavus

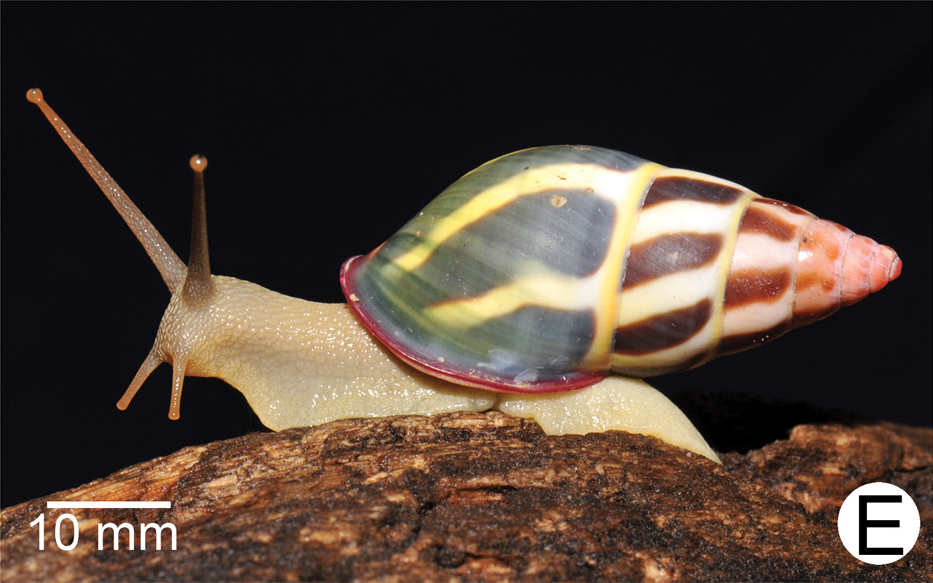
Amphidromus fuscolabris

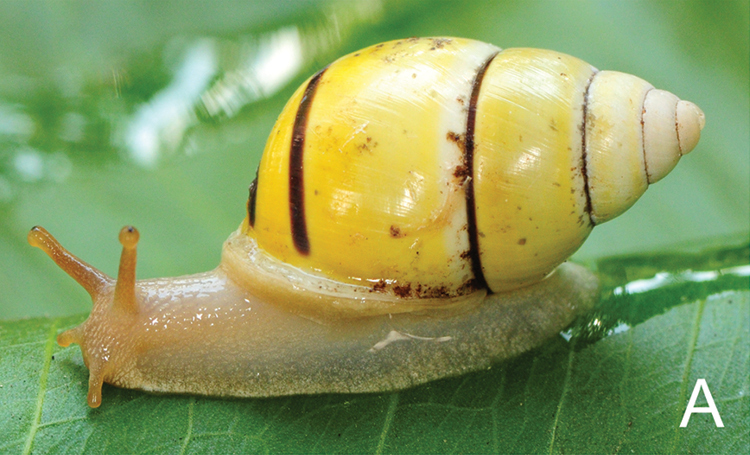
Amphidromus globonevilli

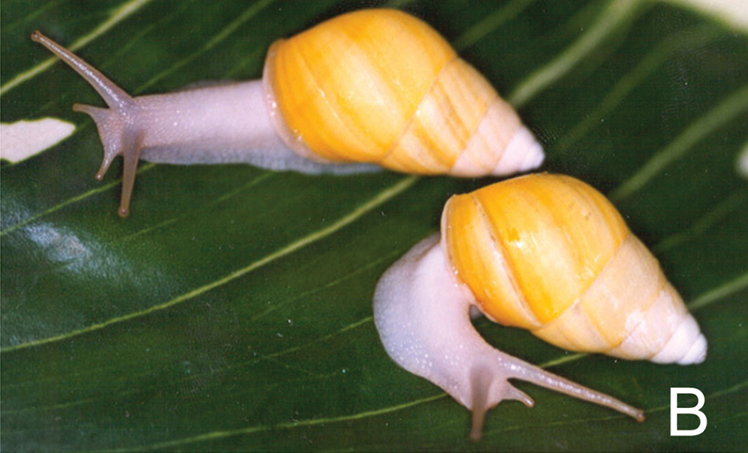
Amphidromus principalis

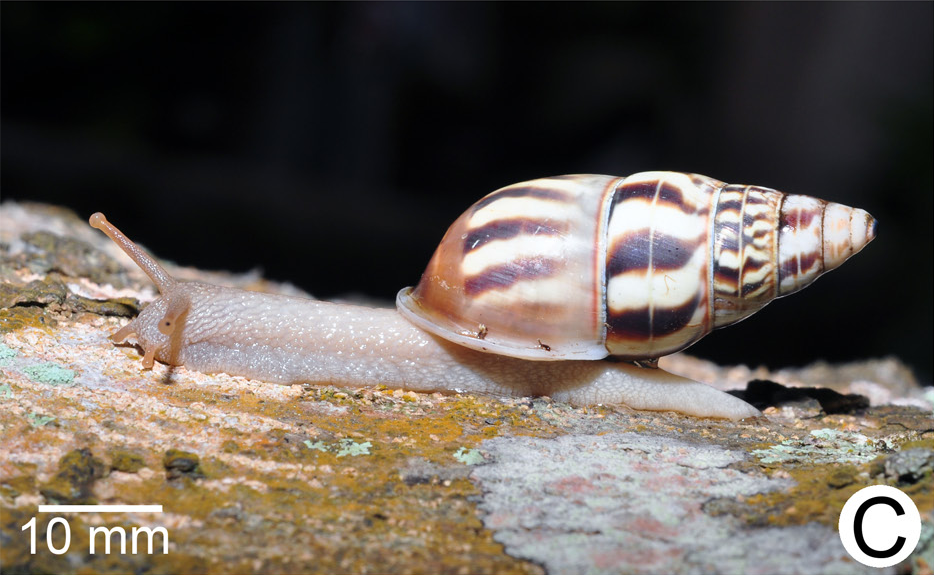
Amphidromus xiengensis

Subgenus ?

- Amphidromus suspectus
  - Amphidromus suspectus albolabiata Fulton, 1896
- Amphidromus thanhhoaensis Thach & F. Huber, 2016
- Amphidromus theobaldianus (Benson, 1857)
- Amphidromus ventrosulus Möllendorff, 1900
- Amphidromus versicolor Fulton, 1896
- Amphidromus webbi Fulton, 1907
  - Amphidromus webbi babiensis Laidlaw, 1954
  - Amphidromus webbi simalurensis Laidlaw, 1954
- Amphidromus winteri
  - Amphidromus winteri inauris Fulton, 1896
- Amphidromus zebrinus (Pfeiffer, 1861)

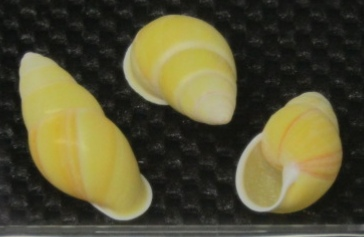
Amphidromus quadrasi

== Synonyms ==
- Amphidromus annamiticus (Crosse & Fischer, 1863): synonym of Amphidromus inversus annamiticus (Crosse & P. Fischer, 1863)
- Amphidromus apoensis Bartsch, 1917: synonym of Amphidromus maculiferus apoensis Bartsch, 1917 (original rank)
- Amphidromus asper Haas, 1934: synonym of Amphidromus buelowi Fruhstorfer, 1905
- Amphidromus attapeuensis Thach & F. Huber, 2017 : synonym of Amphidromus haematostoma Möllendorff, 189 (junior subjective synonym)
- Amphidromus aureus (Dillwyn, 1817) : synonym of Amphidromus perversus var. aureus (Dillwyn, 1817) : synonym of Amphidromus perversus (Linnaeus, 1758) (junior synonym)
- Amphidromus baerorum Thach, 2017 : synonym of Amphidromus smithii Fulton, 1896 (junior subjective synonym)
- Amphidromus berschaueri Thach, 2018: synonym of Amphidromus reflexilabris Schepman, 1892 (incorrect original spelling: named after David Berschauer; junior synonym)
- Amphidromus bilatanensis Bartsch, 1917: synonym of Amphidromus roeseleri Möllendorff, 1894
- Amphidromus bulowi Fruhstorfer, 1905 : synonym of Amphidromus buelowi Fruhstorfer, 1905 (misspelling - incorrect subsequent spelling)
- Amphidromus bülowi Fruhstorfer, 1905 : synonym of Amphidromus buelowi Fruhstorfer, 1905 (correction of diacritical mark mandatory)
- Amphidromus calista Pilsbry, 1900: synonym of Amphidromus chloris (Reeve, 1848) : synonym of Amphidromus sulphuratus (Hombron & Jacquinot, 1847) (junior subjective synonym)
- Amphidromus chloris Reeve, 1848: synonym of Amphidromus sulphuratus (Hombron & Jacquinot, 1847)
- Amphidromus contusus (Reeve, 1848): synonym of Amphidromus inversus (O. F. Müller, 1774) (junior subjective synonym)
- Amphidromus eichhorsti Thach, 2020: synonym of Amphidromus cruentatus (Morelet, 1875) (junior subjective synonym)
- Amphidromus eques (L. Pfeiffer, 1857): synonym of Amphidromus atricallosus (A. Gould, 1843) (unaccepted > junior subjective synonym)
- Amphidromus franzhuberi Thach, 2016: synonym of Amphidromus buelowi Fruhstorfer, 1905 (unaccepted > junior subjective synonym)
- Amphidromus fuscolabris Möllendorff, 1898: synonym of Amphidromus cruentatus (Morelet, 1875) (junior subjective synonym)
- Amphidromus hueae Thach & F. Huber, 2016: synonym of Amphidromus comes (L. Pfeiffer, 1861) (junior subjective synonym)
- Amphidromus interruptus (O. F. Müller, 1774): synonym of Amphidromus perversus var. interruptus (O. F. Müller, 1774): synonym of Amphidromus perversus (Linnaeus, 1758) (superseded combination)
- Amphidromus johnstanisici Thach & Huber, 2017: synonym of Amphidromus placostylus Möllendorff, 1900 (junior subjective synonym)
- Amphidromus lamdongensis Thach & F. Huber, 2016: synonym of Amphidromus cambojiensis (Reeve, 1860) (junior subjective synonym)
- Amphidromus lucsegersi Thach & Abbas, 2017: synonym of Amphidromus reflexilabris Schepman, 1892 (junior synonym)
- Amphidromus michaeli Thach, 2021: synonym of Amphidromus quadrasi quadrasi Hidalgo, 1887 : synonym of Amphidromus quadrasi Hidalgo, 1887 (junior subjective synonym)
- Amphidromus nguyenkhoai Thach, 2020: synonym of Amphidromus costifer E. A. Smith, 1893 (junior subjective synonym)
- Amphidromus noriokowasoei Thach & F. Huber, 2017: synonym of Amphidromus smithii Fulton, 1896 (junior subjective synonym)
- Amphidromus oscitans E. von Martens, 1899: synonym of Amphidromus inconstans Fulton, 1898 (junior subjective synonym)
- Amphidromus pankowskiae Thach, 2020: synonym of Amphidromus cruentatus (Morelet, 1875)
- Amphidromus perakensis Fulton, 1901: synonym of Amphidromus atricallosus perakensis Fulton, 1901 (original combination)
- Amphidromus pervariabilis Bavay & Dautzenberg, 1909: synonym of : synonym of Aegistohadra pervariabilis (Bavay & Dautzenberg, 1909)
- Amphidromus roemeri (Pfeiffer, 1863): synonym of Aegistohadra roemeri (L. Pfeiffer, 1863) (superseded combination)
- Amphidromus schileykoi Thach, 2016: synonym of Amphidromus cambojiensis (Reeve, 1860) (junior subjective synonym)
- Amphidromus stanyi Dharma, 2021: synonym of Amphidromus coeruleus Clench & Archer, 1932 (junior subjective synonym)
- Amphidromus stevenabbasorum Thach, 2021: synonym of Amphidromus jacobsoni Laidlaw, 1954 (junior subjective synonym)
- Amphidromus theobaldianus (W. H. Benson, 1857): synonym of Amphidromus moniliferus (A. Gould, 1846) (junior subjective synonym)
- Amphidromus versicolor Fulton, 1896 : synonym of Amphidromus quadrasi Hidalgo, 1887 (junior subjective synonym)
- Amphidromus vietnamensis Thach & F. Huber, 2017: synonym of Amphidromus comes (L. Pfeiffer, 1861) (junior subjective synonym)
