= Amphidromus kvuongi =

Scientific classification
- Kingdom: Animalia
- Phylum: Mollusca
- Class: Gastropoda
- Order: Stylommatophora
- Family: Camaenidae
- Genus: Amphidromus
- Species: A. kvuongi

Binomial name
- Amphidromus kvuongi Segers, 2023

Synonyms
- Amphidromus (Syndromus) kvuongi Segers, 2023 alternative representation

Species of gastropod

Amphidromus kvuongi is a species of air-breathing land snail, a terrestrial pulmonate gastropod mollusc in the family Camaenidae.

== Distribution ==
This species occurs in Vietnam.
