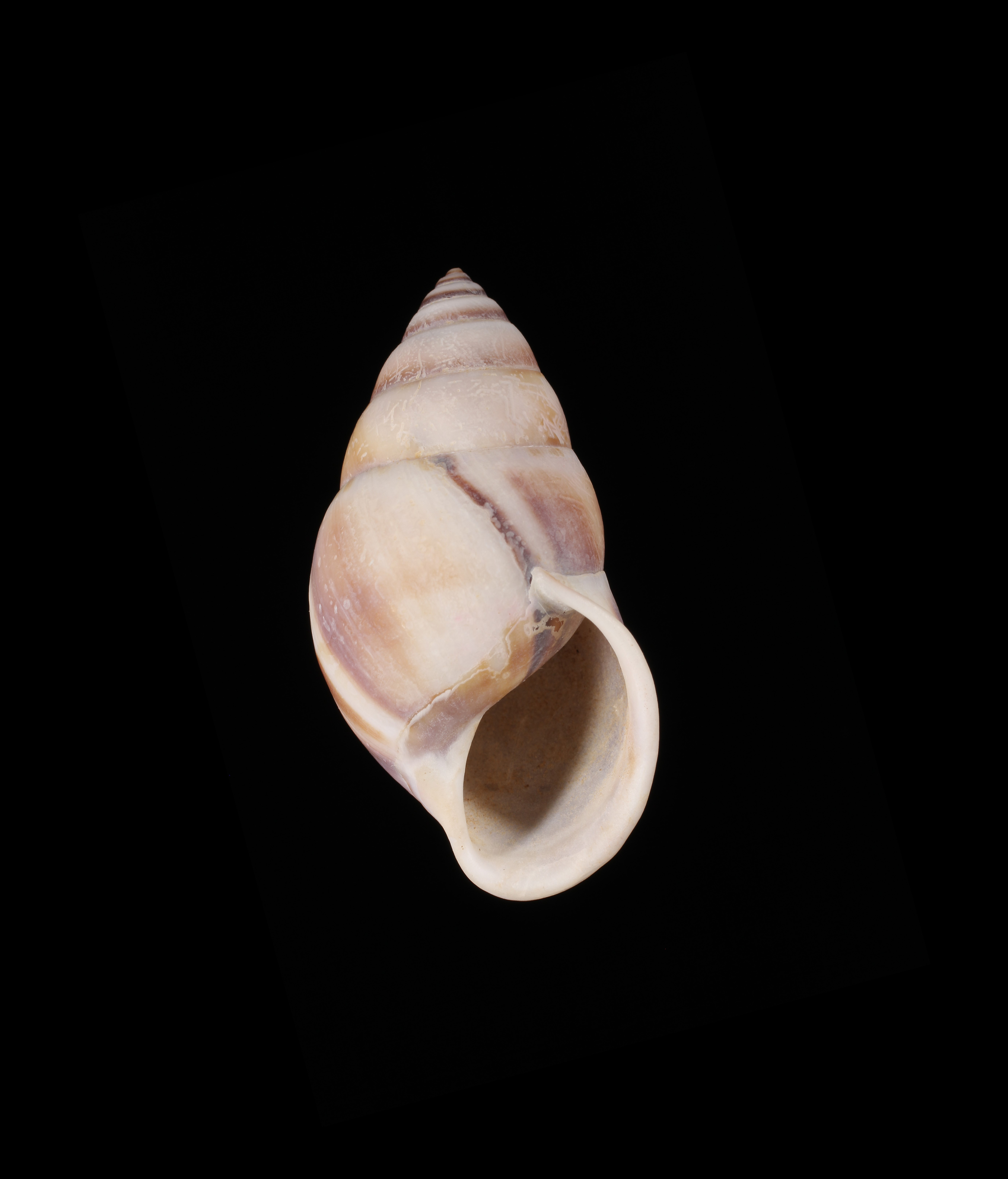
- Shell of Amphidromus gustafi (holotype at MNHN, Paris)

Scientific classification
- Kingdom: Animalia
- Phylum: Mollusca
- Class: Gastropoda
- Order: Stylommatophora
- Family: Camaenidae
- Genus: Amphidromus
- Species: A. gustafi

Binomial name
- Amphidromus gustafi Thach & F. Huber, 2020

= Amphidromus gustafi =

Species of snail

Amphidromus gustafi is a species of air-breathing land snail, classified as a terrestrial pulmonate gastropod mollusc in the family Camaenidae.

== Distribution ==
This species is endemic to Vietnam.
