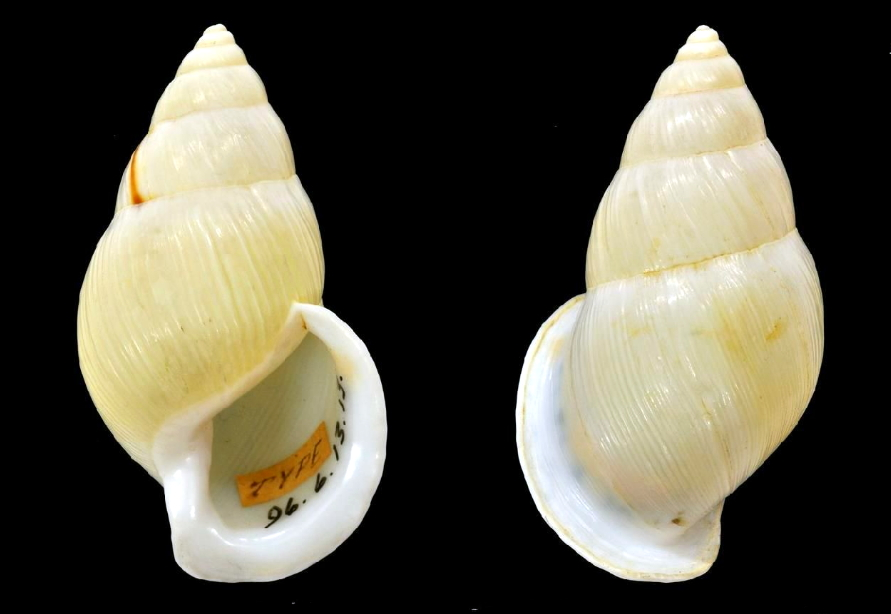
- Shell of Amphidromus winteri inauris (lectotype at the Natural History Museum, London)

Scientific classification
- Kingdom: Animalia
- Phylum: Mollusca
- Class: Gastropoda
- Order: Stylommatophora
- Family: Camaenidae
- Genus: Amphidromus
- Species: A. winteri

Binomial name
- Amphidromus winteri (L. Pfeiffer, 1849)

Synonyms
- Bulimus winteri L. Pfeiffer, 1849 unaccepted (original combination)

= Amphidromus winteri =

Species of tree snail

Amphidromus winteri is a species of air-breathing tree snail, an arboreal gastropod mollusk in the family Camaenidae.

Subspecies

- Amphidromus winteri inauris Fulton, 1896
- Amphidromus winteri winteri (L. Pfeiffer, 1849)

== Description ==
The length of this shell attains 49.4 mm, its diameter 30 mm.

The shell can be either sinistral or dextral. It is openly perforate, and ovate-conic, appearing rather ventricose and solid, though hardly shining. Its surface exhibits strong and irregular wrinkle-like striations and is typically plicate, with the folds wave-like, irregular, and becoming obsolete below the periphery. The shell presents a white, pale straw- or sulfur-tinted, or pale rufous coloration, usually unicolored but sometimes streaked. Comprising six to seven moderately convex whorls, the shell features a slightly oblique aperture that is whitish or pale yellow within. The peristome is white, reflexed, and recurved at the edge. The columella is thick and vertical; and the parietal callus is white.

== Distribution ==
This species is endemic to Java, Indonesia.
