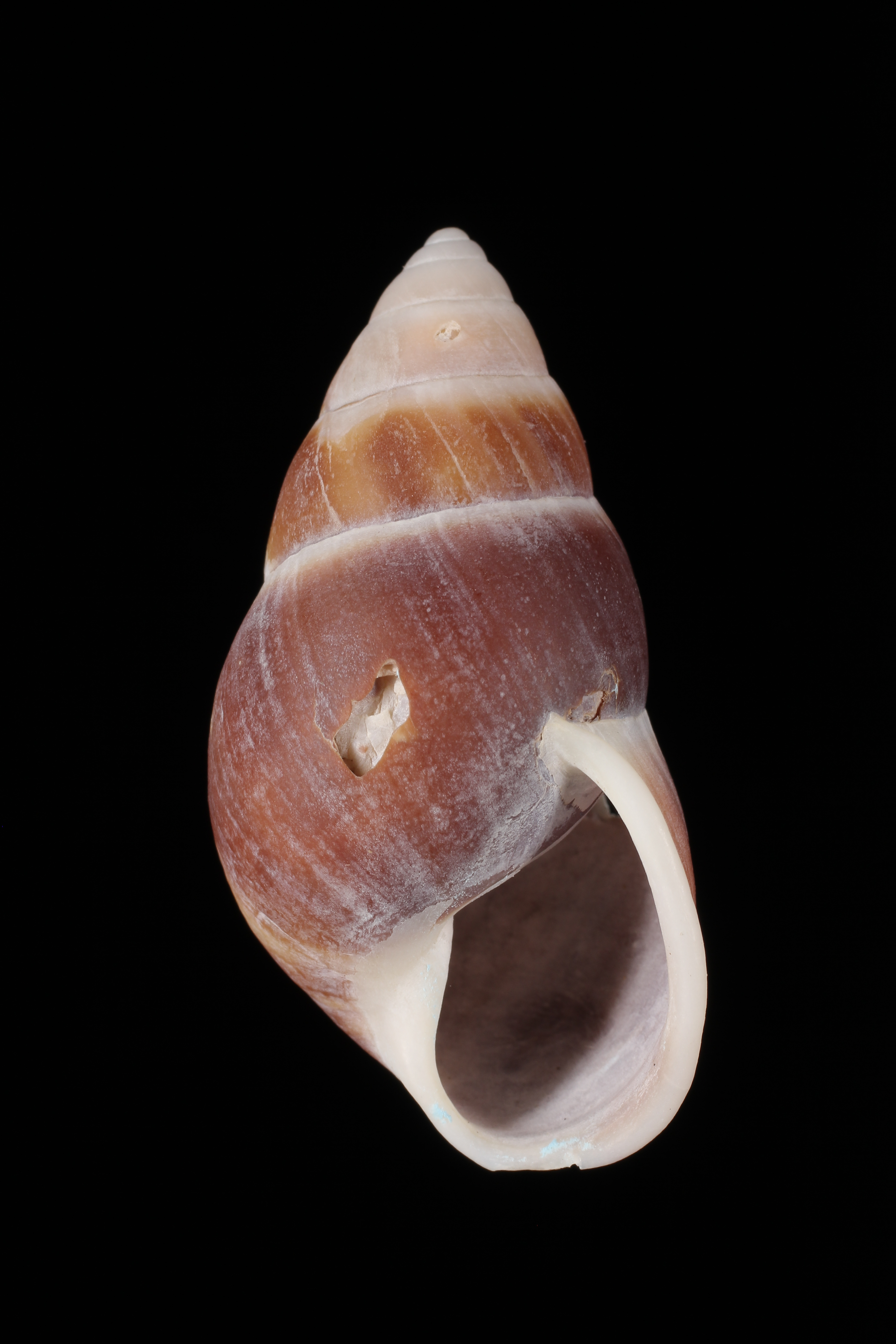
- Shell of Amphidromus kantori (holotype at MNHN, Paris)

Scientific classification
- Domain: Eukaryota
- Kingdom: Animalia
- Phylum: Mollusca
- Class: Gastropoda
- Order: Stylommatophora
- Family: Camaenidae
- Genus: Amphidromus
- Species: A. kantori

Binomial name
- Amphidromus kantori Thach & F. Huber, 2020

= Amphidromus kantori =

Species of snail

Amphidromus kantori is a species of air-breathing land snail, a terrestrial pulmonate gastropod mollusc in the family Camaenidae.

== Distribution ==
This species is endemic to Vietnam.
