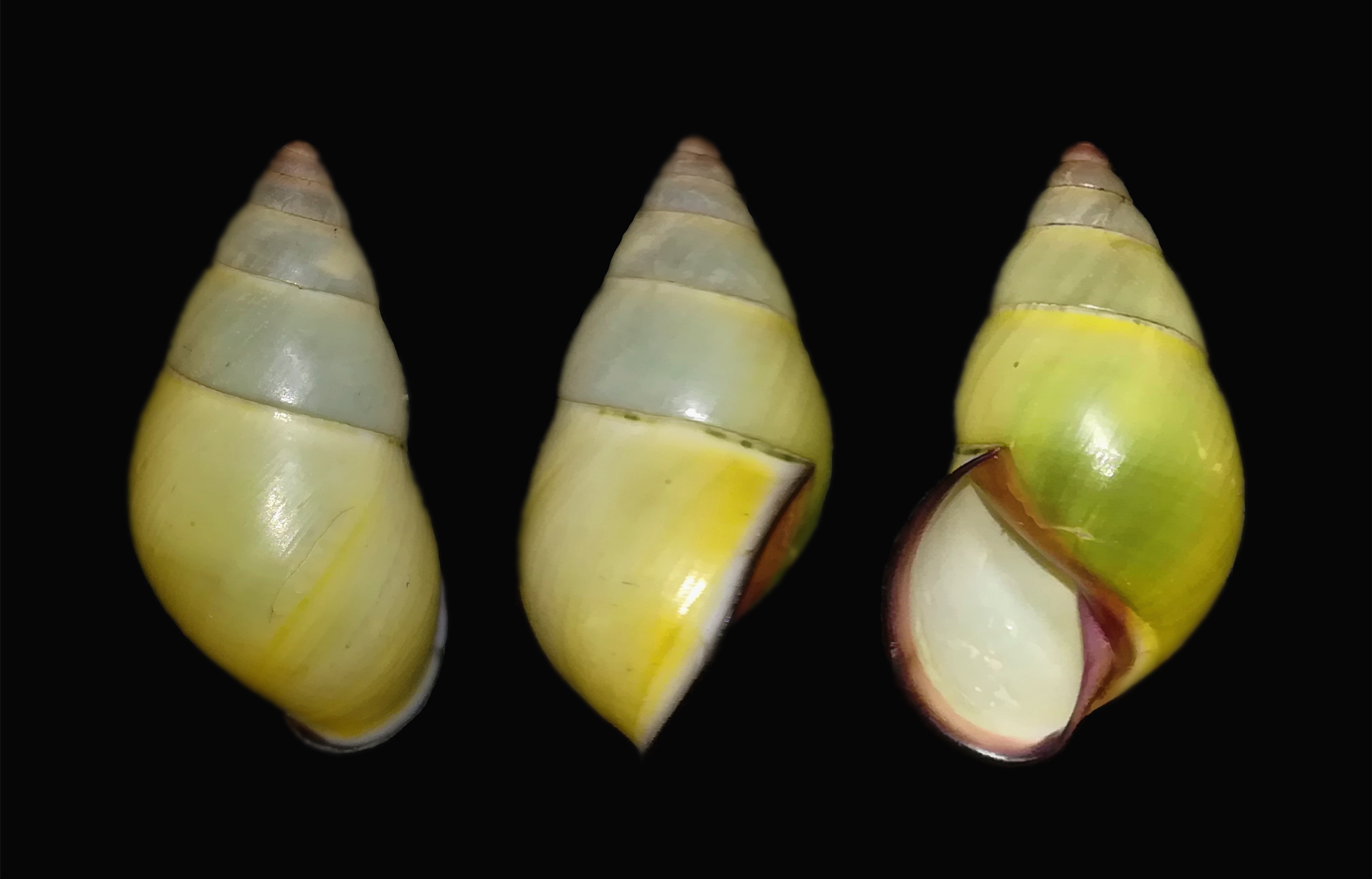

Scientific classification
- Domain: Eukaryota
- Kingdom: Animalia
- Phylum: Mollusca
- Class: Gastropoda
- Order: Stylommatophora
- Family: Camaenidae
- Genus: Amphidromus
- Species: A. haematostoma

Binomial name
- Amphidromus haematostoma Moellendorff, 1898

Synonyms
- Amphidromus (Syndromus) haematostoma Möllendorff, 1898 alternative representation; Amphidromus attapeuensis Thach & F. Huber, 2017 junior subjective synonym; Amphidromus haematostoma var. varians Möllendorff, 1898 junior subjective synonym; Amphidromus haematostoma var. viridis Möllendorff, 1898 junior subjective synonym

= Amphidromus haematostoma =

Species of gastropod

Amphidromus haematostoma is a species of air-breathing tree snail (an arboreal gastropod mollusk in the family Camaenidae.)

== Description ==
The length of the shell varies between 23.8 mm and 37.5 mm, its diameter between 13.3 mm and 21 mm.

(Original description in Latin) The shell is imperforate or presents a slit-like umbilicus, coiling sinistrally in an ovate-conical shape. It feels somewhat solid and exhibits a finely striate, glossy surface. The shell comprises 6 1/2 to 7 somewhat convex whorls. The upper three display a punctate-granulate texture, while the body whorl appears somewhat inflated. The aperture is rather oblique and somewhat ear-shaped. The peristome is broadly expanded and somewhat reflected, forming a lip that is bright purple with a black outer margin. The columella is twisted and excavated above, lying broadly appressed and joining the outer margin via a broad purple callus.

(Redescription) The shell is medium in size, sinistral, and ovate conical. It exhibits a rather thin and glossy texture. The spire appears elongate conical; the apex is acute, lacking a black spot on its tip, and the earlier whorls show a whitish coloration. Comprising six to seven convex to smooth whorls, the shell displays a wide and depressed suture, and the last whorl is well rounded. The periostracum can be thick and corneous or present a green to greenish-yellow color; a varix is occasionally present. The shell's ground color is white or yellowish (without the periostracum); a dark yellow subsutural band and a band around the umbilicus are usually present (though rarely indistinguishable). The parietal callus is thickened and displays a bright to dark rose-pink color. The aperture is broadly ovate, and the inner side of the outer wall appears whitish. The peristome is little thickened, expanded, and weakly reflexed but not attached to the last whorl; the lip shows a bright to dark rose-pink color, sometimes with a slightly darker edge. The columella exhibits a bright to dark rose-pink color and is straight or slightly twisted. The umbilicus is imperforate.

== Distribution ==
The species (Amphidromus haematostoma) is found in South Laos.

== Habitat ==
The species (Amphidromus haematostoma) is found in trees in the South Laos.
