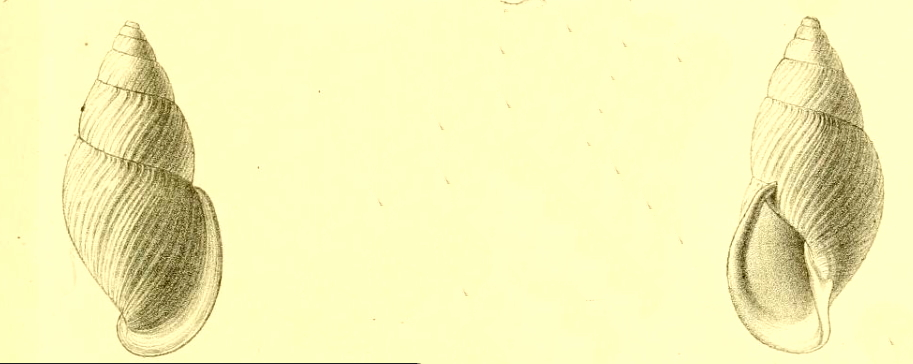
- Shell of Amphidromus beccarii (holotype)

Scientific classification
- Domain: Eukaryota
- Kingdom: Animalia
- Phylum: Mollusca
- Class: Gastropoda
- Order: Stylommatophora
- Family: Camaenidae
- Genus: Amphidromus
- Species: A. beccarii

Binomial name
- Amphidromus beccarii (Tapparone Canefri, 1883)

Synonyms
- Amphidromus (Syndromus) beccarii (Tapparone Canefri, 1883) alternative representation; Bulimus (Amphidromus) beccarii Tapparone Canefri, 1883 superseded combination

= Amphidromus beccarii =

Species of snail in the family Camaenidae

Amphidromus beccarii is a species of medium-sized air-breathing tree snail, an arboreal gastropod mollusk in the family Camaenidae.

Subspecies

- Amphidromus beccarii beccarii (Tapparone Canefri, 1883)
- Amphidromus beccarii xiongi Y.-Q. Wang, 2024

== Description ==
The length of the shell attains 43 mm, its diameter 19 mm.

(Original description in Latin) The compressed, sinistral shell is subumbilicate, fusiform-oblong, longitudinally and obliquely rugose-plicate. It is whitish-yellowish and somewhat shiny. The spire is elevated-conical. The apical whorls are brownish-painted and variably maculate. The apex is subacute. Six slightly convex whorls are separated by an oblique, appressed, submarginate suture. The body whorl is large, slightly convex and basally attenuate. The aperture is ovate-oblong, nearly perpendicular, commensurate with the spire's length. Its interior is whitish. The peristome is white, its margins connected by a very thin parietal callus. The outer and basal margins are expanded and reflected. The columellar margin is dilated, subrectilinear, forming a slight angle with the basal margin.

== Habitat ==
This species lives in trees.

== Distribution ==
The type locality of this sinistral species is Sulawesi, Indonesia.
