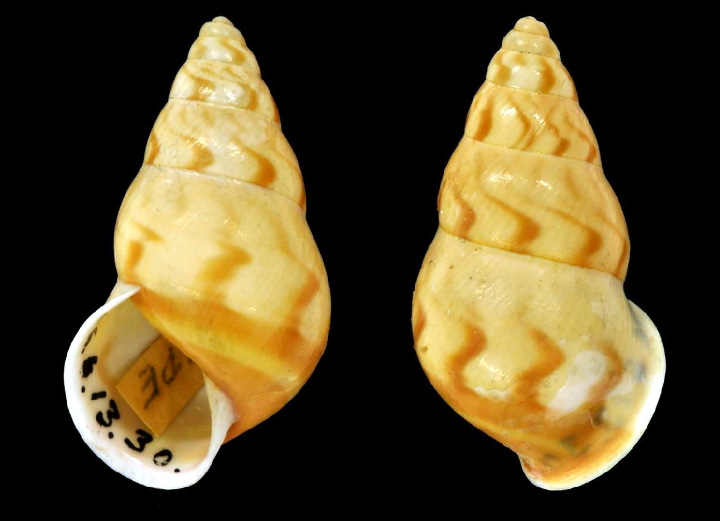
- Shell of Amphidromus hamatus (lectotype at the Natural History Museum, London)

Scientific classification
- Kingdom: Animalia
- Phylum: Mollusca
- Class: Gastropoda
- Order: Stylommatophora
- Family: Camaenidae
- Genus: Amphidromus
- Species: A. hamatus

Binomial name
- Amphidromus hamatus Fulton, 1896

= Amphidromus hamatus =

Species of gastropod

Amphidromus hamatus is a species of air-breathing land snail, a terrestrial pulmonate gastropod mollusc in the family Camaenidae.

== Description ==
The length of the shell attains 27 mm, its diameter 13 mm.

(Original description) This sinistral shell is ovate-conic, nearly imperforate, thin, and exhibits oblique striations. It comprises six to six and a half convex whorls, slightly depressed at the suture. The shell's color varies, presenting either yellow or pink suffusions, with a light red-brown zone at the umbilical area and a band of the same color below the periphery. The whorls are ornamented with short, hooked or zigzag markings. The columella is white and thin. The outer lip is white and slightly expanded.

== Distribution ==
The type species was found on Labuan Island, Malaysia.
