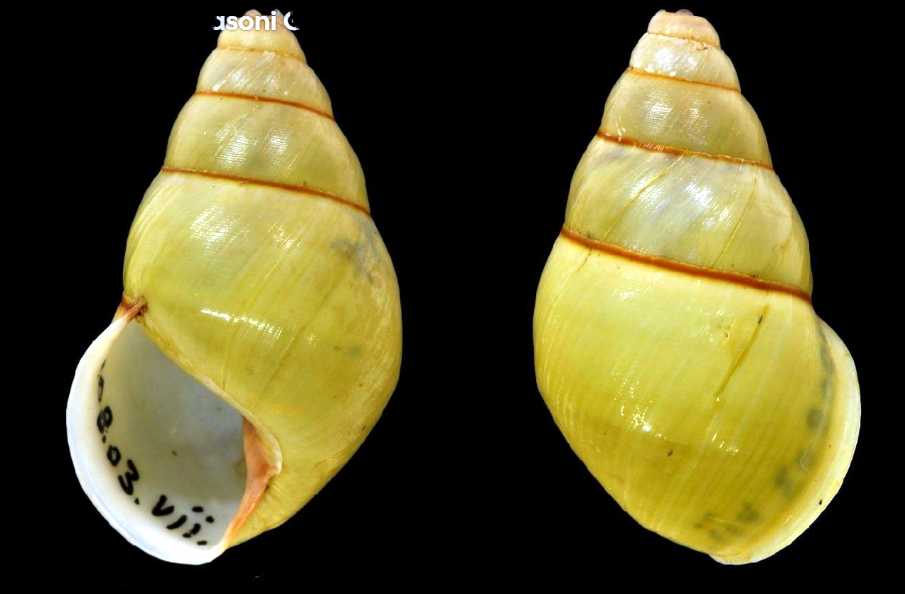
- Shell of Amphidromus masoni (lectotype at Natural History Museum, London)

Scientific classification
- Domain: Eukaryota
- Kingdom: Animalia
- Phylum: Mollusca
- Class: Gastropoda
- Order: Stylommatophora
- Family: Camaenidae
- Genus: Amphidromus
- Species: A. masoni

Binomial name
- Amphidromus masoni (Godwin-Austen, 1876)

Synonyms
- Amphidromus daflaensis (Godwin-Austen), Nevill, 1878; Bulimus masoni Godwin-Austen, 1876 superseded combination

= Amphidromus masoni =

Species of gastropod

Amphidromus masoni is a species of air-breathing, arboreal land snails in the family Camaenidae.

== Distribution ==
This species is endemic to Assam, India.

== Description ==
The height of the shell attains 30.5 mm, its diameter 12.75 mm.

(Original description) This sinistral shell is acuminately oblong, thick, with a rather flattened spire. It comprises seven smooth and glossy whorls, exhibiting fine spiral striations under magnification. The shell's color is sea-green, intensifying below the keel and fading towards the apex. The columella is dark purple, and a narrow fillet of the same color closely borders the suture below, originating at the upper and outer angle of the aperture. The aperture is oval, angular above, with a slightly reflected lip. The body whorl is slightly keeled.
