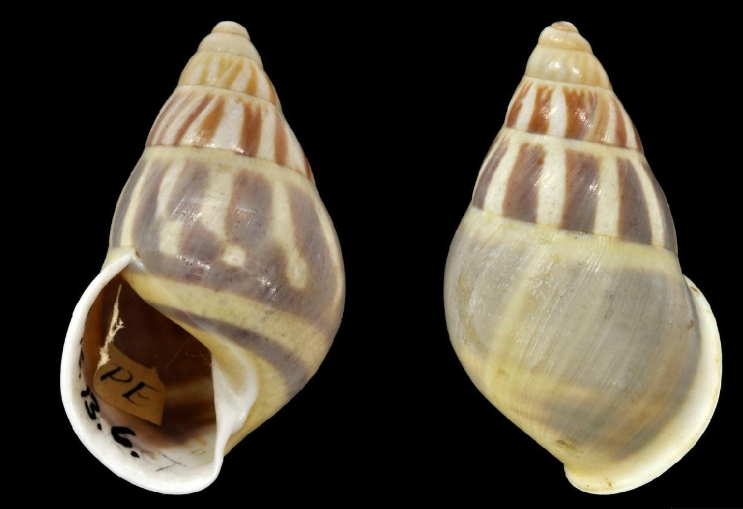
- Shell of Amphidromus dubius (lectotype at the Natural History Museum, London)

Scientific classification
- Kingdom: Animalia
- Phylum: Mollusca
- Class: Gastropoda
- Order: Stylommatophora
- Family: Camaenidae
- Genus: Amphidromus
- Species: A. dubius

Binomial name
- Amphidromus dubius Fulton, 1896

Synonyms
- Amphidromus quadrasi aborlanensis Bartsch, 1946 junior subjective synonym; Amphidromus quadrasi dubius Fulton, 1896 superseded rank; Amphidromus quadrasi f. dubius Fulton, 1896; Amphidromus versicolor aborlanensis Bartsch, 1946

= Amphidromus dubius =

Species of gastropod

Amphidromus dubius is a species of air-breathing land snail, a terrestrial pulmonate gastropod mollusc in the family Camaenidae.

== Description ==
The length of the shell attains 31.5 mm, its diameter 18 mm.

(Original description) This sinistral shell is ovate to oblong-conic, obliquely striated, and subangulate at the periphery, lacking an umbilicus. It consists of six convex whorls, with the first three being semi-transparent. The lower whorls are cream-colored with oblique, often branched, bluish-grey stripes. A spiral yellow band encircles the lower portion of the body whorl, which itself transitions to either bluish-grey or a greenish tint in its last half. The apex is dark brown. The columella is thin, white, and slightly expanded above. The outer lip is expanded and somewhat reflected, also white. The aperture interior is dark brown.

== Distribution ==
The type species was found on Balabac Island, the Philippines.
