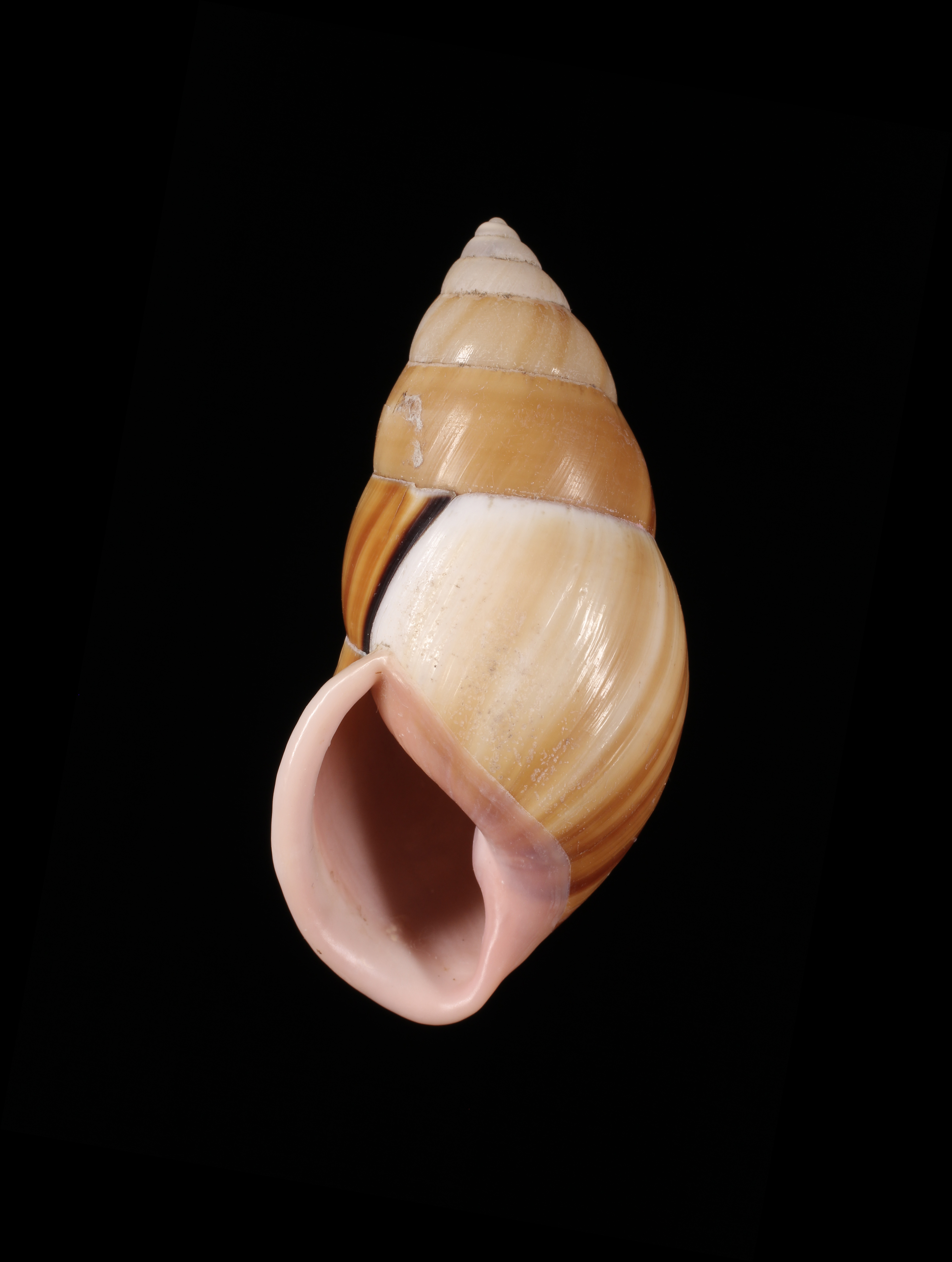
- Shell of Amphidromus thachorum (holotype at MNHN, Paris))

Scientific classification
- Kingdom: Animalia
- Phylum: Mollusca
- Class: Gastropoda
- Order: Stylommatophora
- Family: Camaenidae
- Genus: Amphidromus
- Species: A. thachorum

Binomial name
- Amphidromus thachorum F. Huber, 2020

= Amphidromus thachorum =

Species of snail

Amphidromus thachorum is a species of air-breathing land snail, a terrestrial pulmonate gastropod mollusc in the family Camaenidae.

== Description ==
The length of the shell attains 53.2 mm.

== Distribution ==
This species is endemic to Laos and Cambodia.
