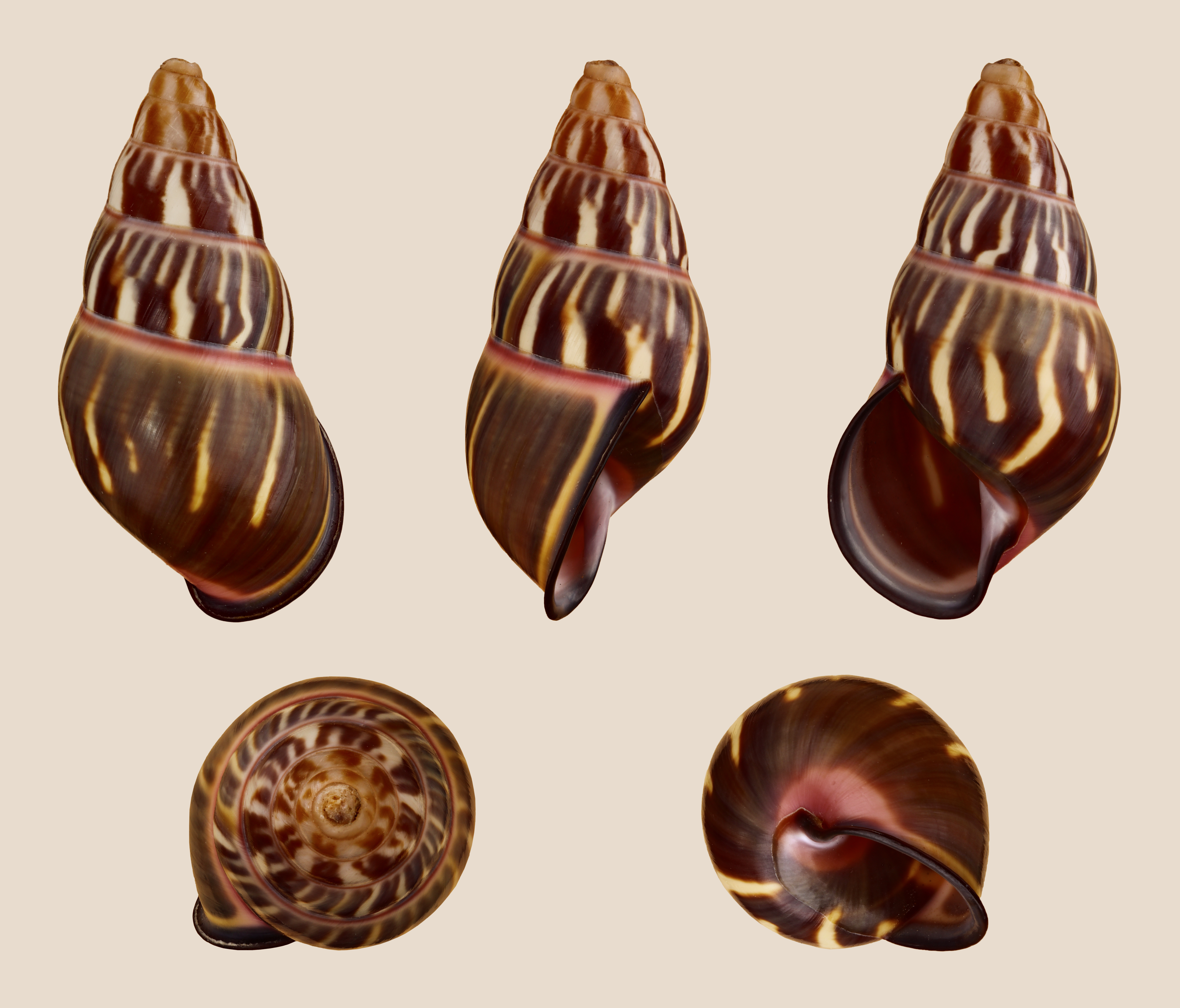
- Shell of Amphidromus quadrasi quadrasi

Scientific classification
- Domain: Eukaryota
- Kingdom: Animalia
- Phylum: Mollusca
- Class: Gastropoda
- Order: Stylommatophora
- Family: Camaenidae
- Genus: Amphidromus
- Species: A. quadrasi

Binomial name
- Amphidromus quadrasi Hidalgo, 1887

Synonyms
- see list

= Amphidromus quadrasi =

Species of snail in the family Camaenidae

Amphidromus quadrasi is a species of air-breathing land snail in the family Camaenidae.

== Description ==
(Original description by P. Bartsch) The sinistral shell is regular and elongate-conic. Its early whorls are white. The two whorls in the protoconch appear well rounded, and are marked with numerous very fine, evenly scattered granules. The whorls in the teleoconch are appressed at the summit and smooth, exhibiting only very fine, decidedly retractive lines of growth and numerous exceedingly fine spiral striations. The sutures are only slightly constricted. The periphery of the body whorl is angulated in young shells and very feebly angulated in the adult. The base appears well rounded and is marked like the spire. The aperture is moderately large and oblique. The outer lip is reflected; the inner lip is moderately reflected. The parietal wall is glazed with a thin callus.

The coloration of typical Amphidromus quadrasi quadrasi is as follows: Early whorls are white, without a dark spot at the tip of the nucleus. The rest of the shell is yellow marked with numerous fine, decidedly retractive green lines, which tend to become fused toward the latter part of the shell, giving it a green aspect. These green lines do not quite extend to the summit. The summit is marked by a very slender yellowish-white line. This is followed by a moderately broad red band, which, in turn, is followed by a narrow yellow zone anteriorly. A red area surrounds the umbilical area, and this is followed at its posterior edge by a moderately broad yellow zone. The inside of the aperture and lip are white.

== Distribution ==
This species is found in Candaraman Island, Palawan Province, the Philippines.

== Synonyms ==
- Amphidromus (Syndromus) quadrasi Hidalgo, 1887 alternative representation
- Amphidromus (Syndromus) quadrasi everetti Fulton, 1896 ·
- Amphidromus michaeli Thach, 2021 junior subjective synonym
- Amphidromus quadrasi caxisiganensis Bartsch, 1918
- Amphidromus quadrasi everetti Fulton, 1896 ·
- Amphidromus quadrasi f. everetti Fulton, 1896
- Amphidromus quadrasi f. palawanensis Bartsch, 1917 ·
- Amphidromus quadrasi f. solida Fulton, 1896 ·
- Amphidromus quadrasi f. versicolor Fulton, 1896 ·
- Amphidromus quadrasi ledyardi Bartsch, 1918 ·
- Amphidromus quadrasi palawanensis Bartsch, 1917 superseded rank
- Amphidromus quadrasi quadrasi Hidalgo, 1887 superseded rank
- Amphidromus quadrasi solida Fulton, 1896 ·
- Amphidromus quadrasi solidus Fulton, 1896 superseded rank
- Amphidromus quadrasi var. solida Fulton, 1896 ·
- Amphidromus quadrasi versicolor Fulton, 1896 junior subjective synonym
- Amphidromus versicolor Fulton, 1896 junior subjective synonym
- Amphidromus versicolor canabunganensis Bartsch, 1919 ·
- Amphidromus versicolor demesai Bartsch, 1946
- Amphidromus versicolor higginsi Bartsch, 1918
- Amphidromus versicolor monticolus Bartsch, 1918
- Amphidromus versicolor secamensis Bartsch, 1919 (junior synonym)
- Amphidromus versicolor weberi Bartsch, 1918
