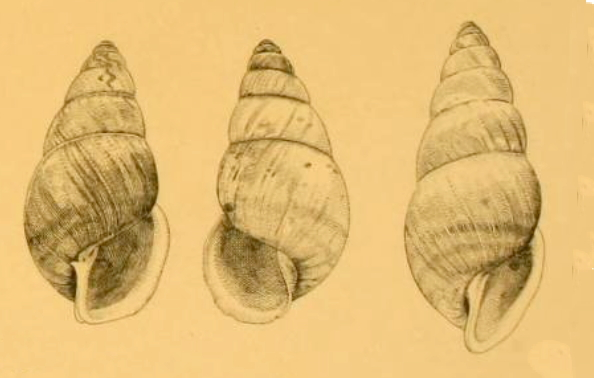
- Shell of Amphidromus centrocelebensis (holotype)

Scientific classification
- Domain: Eukaryota
- Kingdom: Animalia
- Phylum: Mollusca
- Class: Gastropoda
- Order: Stylommatophora
- Family: Camaenidae
- Genus: Amphidromus
- Species: A. centrocelebensis

Binomial name
- Amphidromus centrocelebensis Bollinger, 1918

Synonyms
- Amphidromus (Syndromus) centrocelebensis Bollinger, 1918 alternative representation

= Amphidromus centrocelebensis =

Species of gastropod

Amphidromus centrocelebensis is a species of air-breathing land snail, a terrestrial pulmonate gastropod mollusc in the family Camaenidae.

== Description ==
Shells can reach a length of about 49 millimetres (1.9 in), its diameter 17 millimetres (0.67 in)

(Original description in German) Shell: The conical shell is sinistral or dextral. It is sometimes short and stout (especially the sinistral ones), sometimes strongly elongated. The umbilicus is completely or almost completely covered. The surface is radially lined by delicate growth lines. Under a magnifying glass one can see occasionally extremely fine spiral undulations. The shell contains 6 1/2 to 7 1/2 rather strongly convex whorls, which here and there are pressed against a narrow border. The whorls show a blunt but distinct edge, which the body whorl retains up to the apertural margin, and which in unworn shells is highlighted by a dark, fine color line. The apertural plane is oblique to the main axis. The aperture is oval to roundly oval. Its margin is turned outwards, even backwards, but not particularly wide, white, connected by a more or less distinct callus.

Color of the shell: yellowish-white to citron yellow, also greenish-yellow; unicolored, occasionally with a somewhat paler zone along the upper suture. Besides the already mentioned edge line, one or another shell shows on the underside of the body whorl the faint indication of two or three spiral bands. The aperture's interior is white to light yellow.

== Distribution ==
This species can be found in Sulawesi, Indonesia.
