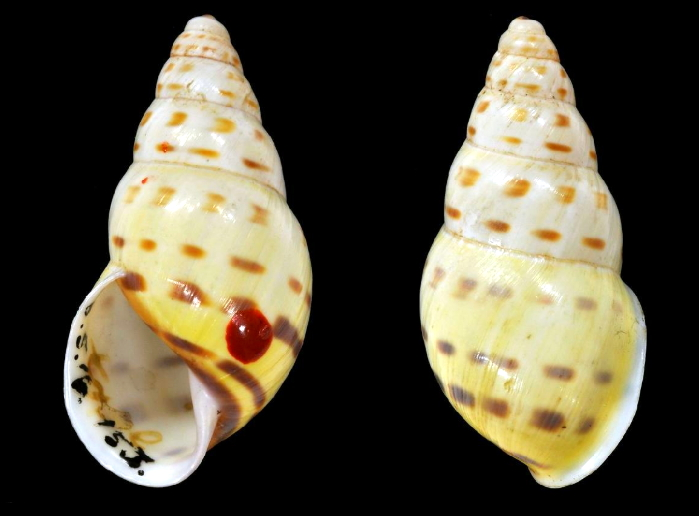
- Shell of Amphidromus kalaoensis (holotype at the Natural History Museum, London)

Scientific classification
- Kingdom: Animalia
- Phylum: Mollusca
- Class: Gastropoda
- Order: Stylommatophora
- Family: Camaenidae
- Genus: Amphidromus
- Species: A. kalaoensis

Binomial name
- Amphidromus kalaoensis Fulton, 1896

= Amphidromus kalaoensis =

Species of gastropod

Amphidromus kalaoensis is a species of air-breathing land snail, a terrestrial pulmonate gastropod mollusc in the family Camaenidae.

== Description ==
The length of the shell attains 32 mm, its diameter 16 mm.

(Original description) The sinistral shell is polished, oblong-conic, and nearly imperforate. It consists of six convex, obliquely striated whorls. The first two whorls are white with a dark brown apex. The lower whorls are yellow, featuring two equidistant spiral bands of square and oblong dark brown spots, positioned below and above the suture. Additionally, the body whorl displays a wider band of similar spots below the periphery and a continuous band above the dark brown umbilical area. The outer lip and the columella are white, with the lip slightly expanded and the columella thickened at the insertion point but not reflected. A thin, reddish, transparent callus connects them, investing the parietal wall.

== Distribution ==
The type species was found on Kalao island, Sulawesi, Indonesia.
