= Amphidromus epidemiae =

Scientific classification
- Kingdom: Animalia
- Phylum: Mollusca
- Class: Gastropoda
- Order: Stylommatophora
- Family: Camaenidae
- Genus: Amphidromus
- Species: A. epidemiae

Binomial name
- Amphidromus epidemiae Y.-C. Wang, 2021

Species of snail in the family Camaenidae

Amphidromus epidemiae is a species of air-breathing land snail in the family Camaenidae.

== Distribution ==
This species is found in Sarawak, East Malaysia.
