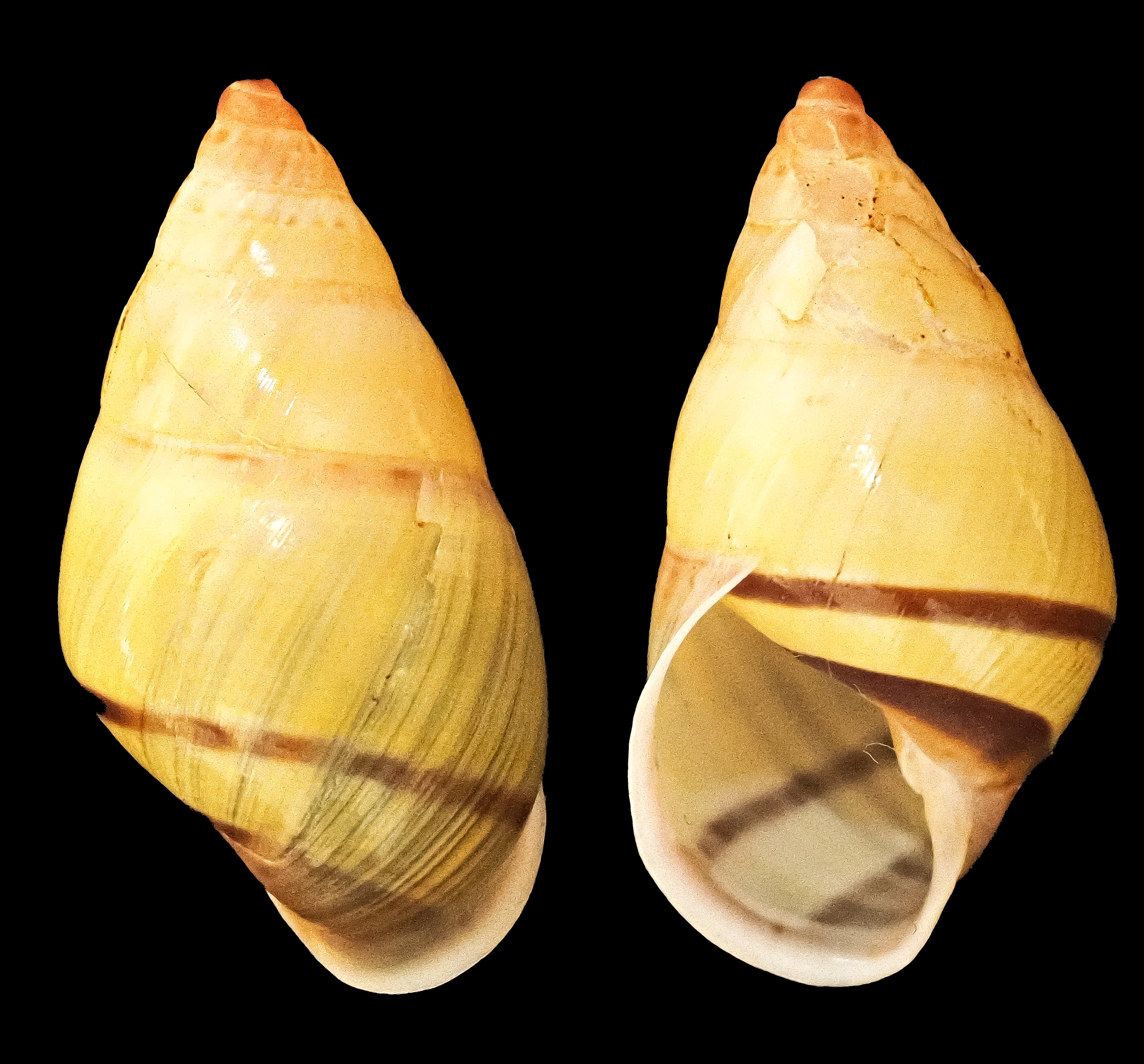
- Shell of Amphidromus petestimpsoni (holotype at the MNHN, Paris)

Scientific classification
- Kingdom: Animalia
- Phylum: Mollusca
- Class: Gastropoda
- Order: Stylommatophora
- Family: Camaenidae
- Genus: Amphidromus
- Species: A. petestimpsoni

Binomial name
- Amphidromus petestimpsoni Thach, 2021

= Amphidromus petestimpsoni =

Species of tree snail

Amphidromus petestimpsoni is a species of air-breathing tree snail, an arboreal gastropod mollusk in the family Camaenidae.

== Description ==
The length of this sinistral shell attains 28.1 mm.

== Distribution ==
This species is endemic to Vietnam.
