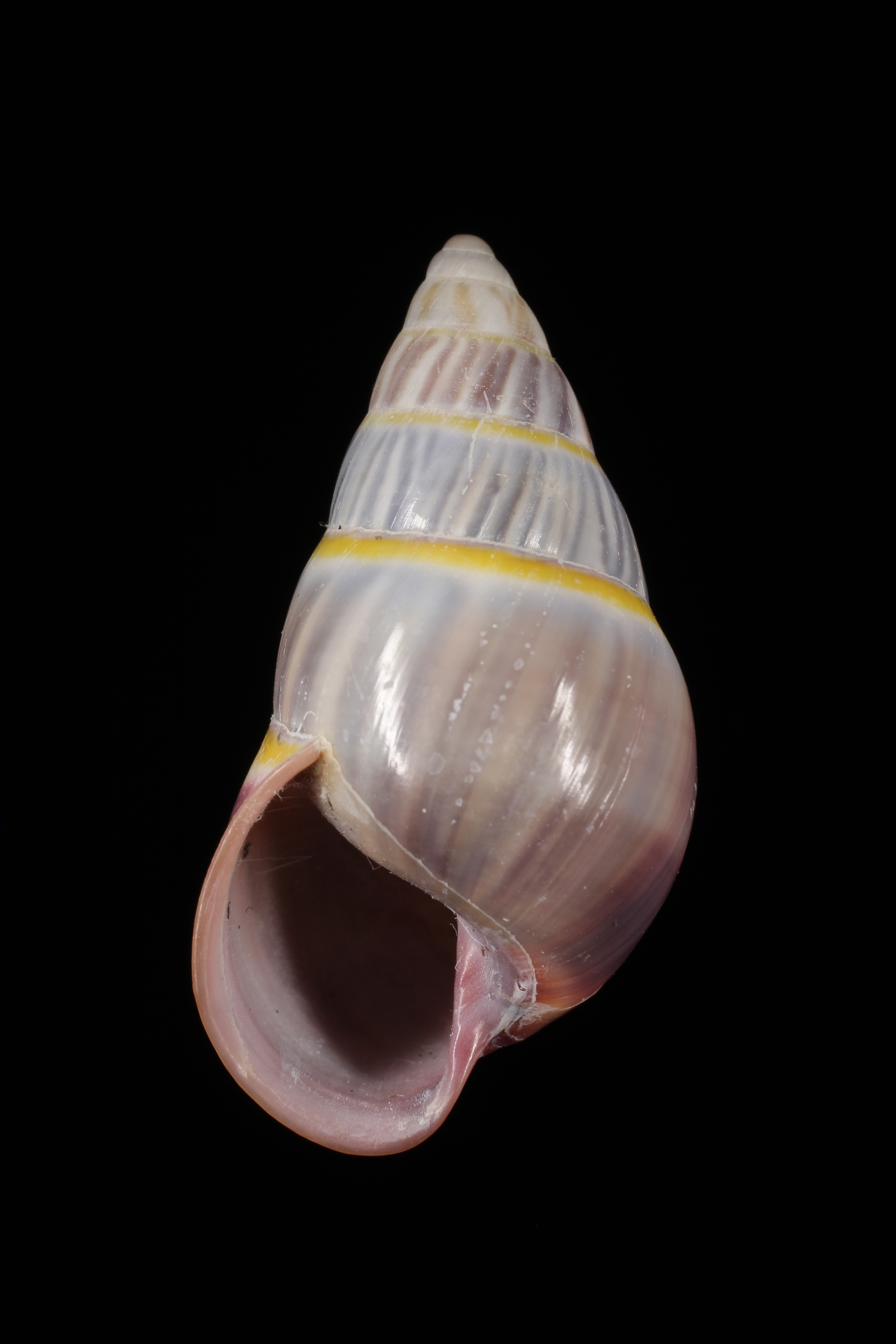
- Shell of Amphidromus duboismercesylviae (holotype at MNHN, Paris))

Scientific classification
- Domain: Eukaryota
- Kingdom: Animalia
- Phylum: Mollusca
- Class: Gastropoda
- Order: Stylommatophora
- Family: Camaenidae
- Genus: Amphidromus
- Species: A. duboismercesylviae

Binomial name
- Amphidromus duboismercesylviae Thach & F. Huber, 2020

= Amphidromus duboismercesylviae =

Species of snail

Amphidromus duboismercesylviae is a species of air-breathing land snail, a terrestrial pulmonate gastropod mollusc in the family Camaenidae.

== Distribution ==
This species is endemic to Vietnam.
