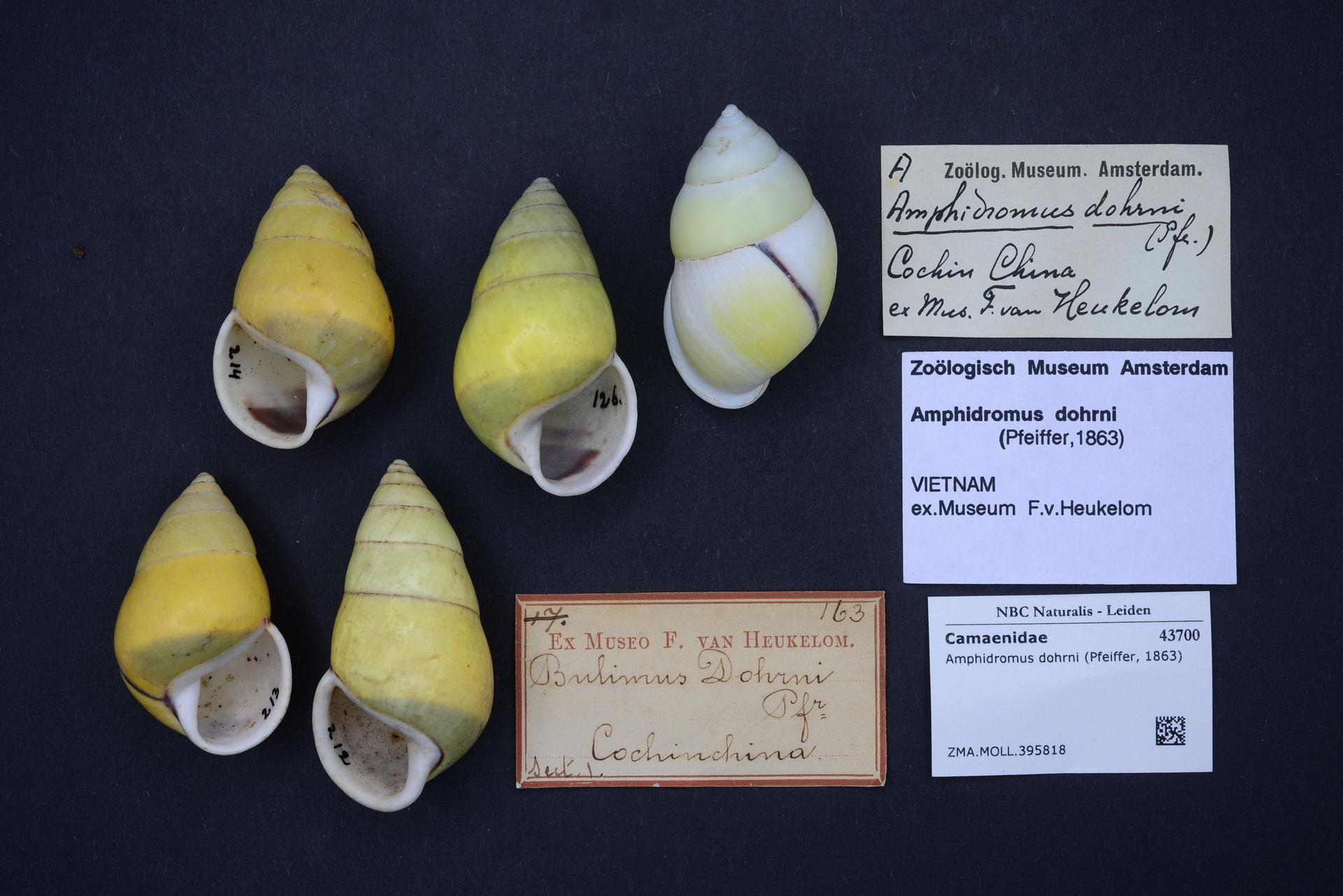
- Shell of Amphidromus dohrni (specimen at Naturalis Biodiversity Center)

Scientific classification
- Kingdom: Animalia
- Phylum: Mollusca
- Class: Gastropoda
- Order: Stylommatophora
- Family: Camaenidae
- Genus: Amphidromus
- Species: A. dohrni

Binomial name
- Amphidromus dohrni (L. Pfeiffer, 1864)

Synonyms
- Bulimus dohrni L. Pfeiffer, 1864

= Amphidromus dohrni =

Species of snail

Amphidromus dohrni is a species of air-breathing land snail, a terrestrial pulmonate gastropod mollusc in the family Camaenidae.

== Description ==
The length of the shell attains 46.3 mm (1.82 in), its diameter 24.3 mm (0.96 in).

(Original description in Latin) The shell is imperforate, oblong-conical, solid and smooth. It displays a sulfur-yellow color. Its spire appears elongated and somewhat regularly conical, bearing one to two blackish-chestnut varices, and terminating in a somewhat blunt apex. It comprises seven whorls that are scarcely somewhat convex, with the body whorl slightly exceeding 4/7 of the shell's length and presenting a rounded base. A broad livid or greenish band marks the area below the middle of the body whorl. The aperture is slightly oblique and small, with a somewhat rhomboid-oval shape. The columella is short and somewhat folded above. The peristome is scarcely expanded, thick, and milky white, being encircled by a chestnut streak, and its margins are joined by a thick white entering callus.

== Distribution ==
This species is endemic to southern Vietnam.
