= Amphidromus timorensis =

Scientific classification
- Kingdom: Animalia
- Phylum: Mollusca
- Class: Gastropoda
- Order: Stylommatophora
- Family: Camaenidae
- Genus: Amphidromus
- Species: A. timorensis

Binomial name
- Amphidromus timorensis J. Parsons & Abbas, 2020

Synonyms
- Amphidromus (Syndromus) timorensis J. Parsons & Abbas, 2020 alternative representation

Species of snail

Amphidromus timorensis is a species of air-breathing land snail, a terrestrial pulmonate gastropod mollusc in the family Camaenidae.

== Distribution ==
This species is endemic to Timor Island.
