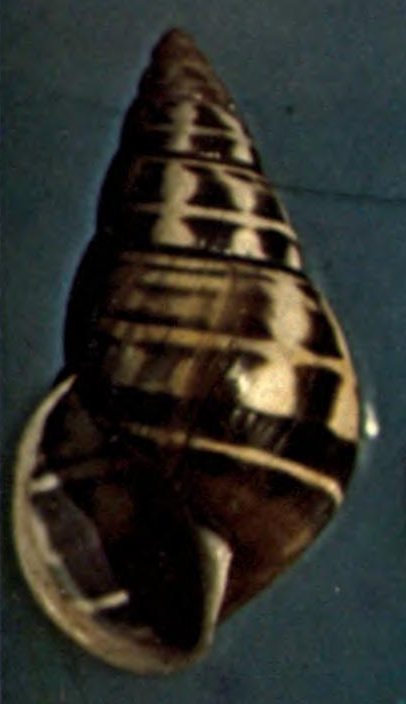
- apertural view of the shell of Amphidromus poecilochroa

Scientific classification
- Kingdom: Animalia
- Phylum: Mollusca
- Class: Gastropoda
- Order: Stylommatophora
- Family: Camaenidae
- Genus: Amphidromus
- Species: A. poecilochroa

Binomial name
- Amphidromus poecilochroa Fulton, 1896

Synonyms
- Amphidromus (Syndromus) poecilochroa Fulton, 1896 alternative representation; Amphidromus (Syndromus) poecilochrous Fulton, 1896; Amphidromus poecilochrous Fulton, 1896 misspelling - incorrect subsequent spelling

= Amphidromus poecilochroa =

Species of gastropod

Amphidromus poecilochroa is a species of air-breathing land snail, a terrestrial pulmonate gastropod mollusc in the family Camaenidae.

Subspecies

- Amphidromus poecilochroa adonaraensis Dharma, 2007
- Amphidromus poecilochroa asmani Djajasasmita, 1963
- Amphidromus poecilochroa candidus Djajasasmita, 1963
- Amphidromus poecilochroa jaeckeli Laidlaw, 1954
- Amphidromus poecilochroa lembataensis Dharma, 2007
- Amphidromus poecilochroa poecilochroa Fulton, 1896

== Description ==
The length of the shell attains 35 mm, its diameter 19 mm.

(Original description) The sinistral shell is ovate-conic, exhibiting a thin structure, an obliquely striate surface, and a shining appearance. It is almost or quite imperforate and lemon-colored, adorned with oblique dark brown stripes that are interrupted by a spiral yellow band. The lower part of the body whorl is encircled by three dark brown bands, which are separated by two other bands, the lower one broad and light red, the upper narrow and yellow. Comprising six slightly convex whorls, the shell features a thin, straight columella and a slightly expanded, flesh-colored outer lip.

== Distribution ==
The species is endemic to Sumbawa Island, Indonesia.
