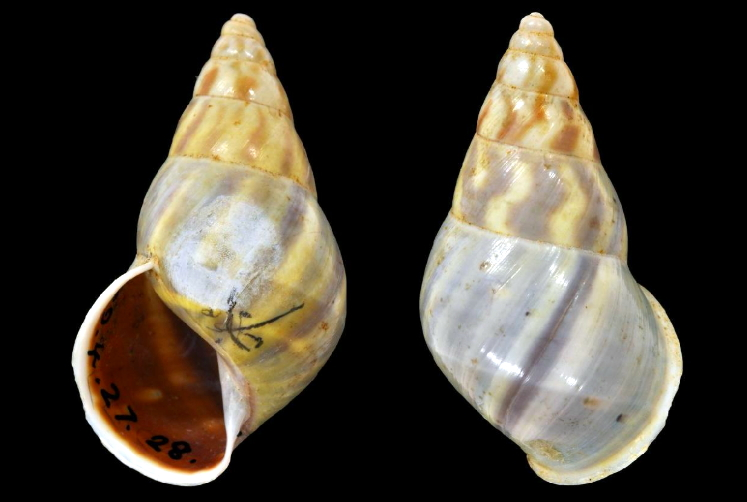
- Shell of Amphidromus angulatus (lectotype at the Natural History Museum, London)

Scientific classification
- Kingdom: Animalia
- Phylum: Mollusca
- Class: Gastropoda
- Order: Stylommatophora
- Family: Camaenidae
- Genus: Amphidromus
- Species: A. angulatus

Binomial name
- Amphidromus angulatus Fulton, 1896

= Amphidromus angulatus =

Species of gastropod

Amphidromus angulatus is a species of air-breathing land snail, a terrestrial pulmonate gastropod mollusc in the family Camaenidae.

== Description ==
The length of the shell attains 37 mm, its diameter 20 mm.

(Original description) This sinistral shell is ovate-conic, thin, and exhibits a more or less sharp angulation at the periphery. It displays oblique striations and has an almost obscured umbilicus. The shell comprises 6.5 to 7 slightly convex whorls. Coloration varies, presenting either fawn with oblique brown stripes on the upper whorls, or pale yellow with bluish-grey stripes, banded at the lower part of the body whorl. The columella is white, straight, and relatively thin. The outer lip is somewhat expanded and white, while the interior of the aperture is dark brown.

== Distribution ==
The type species was found in Sarawak, Malaysia.
