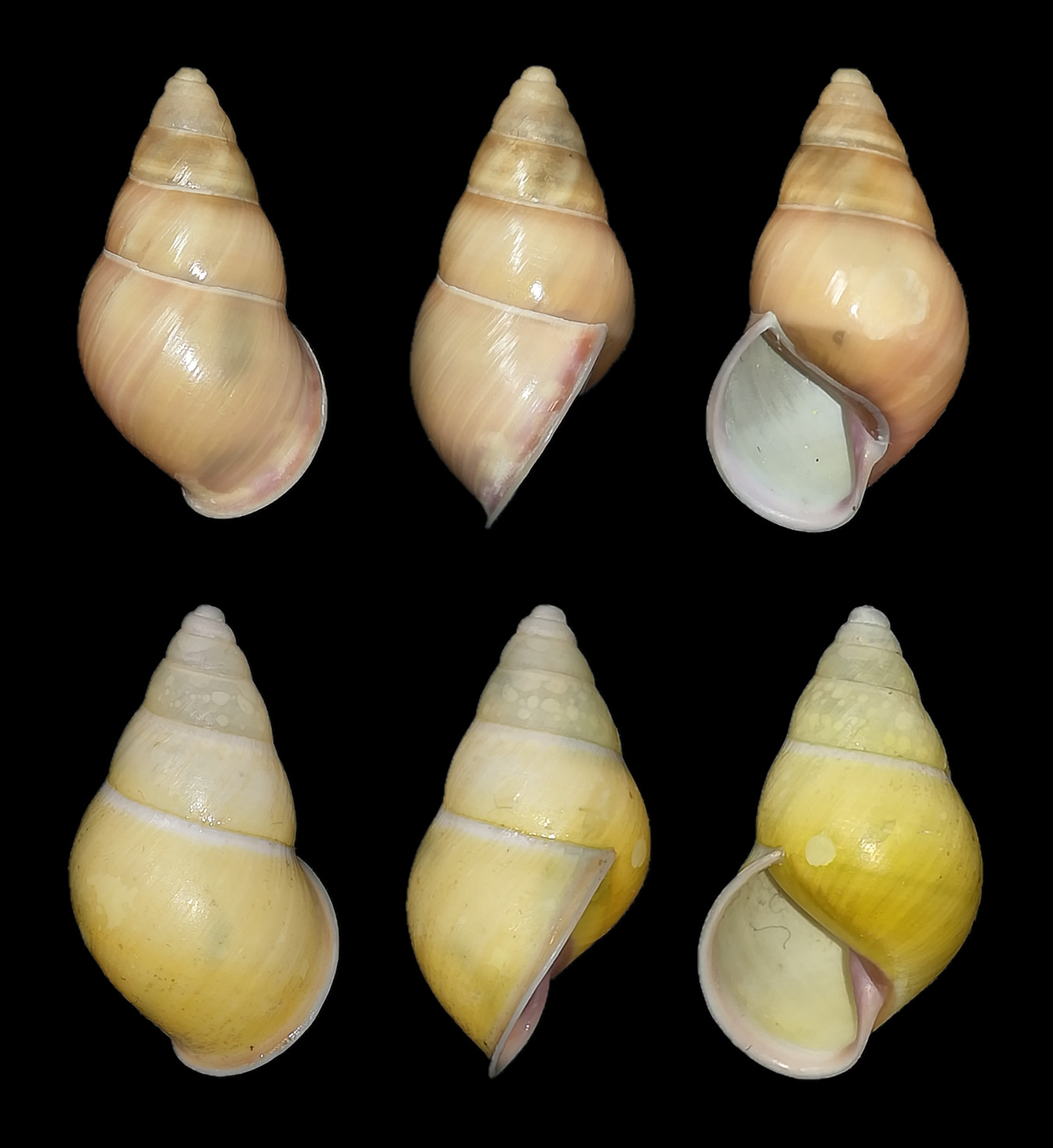

Scientific classification
- Kingdom: Animalia
- Phylum: Mollusca
- Class: Gastropoda
- Order: Stylommatophora
- Family: Camaenidae
- Genus: Amphidromus
- Species: A. alicetandiasae

Binomial name
- Amphidromus alicetandiasae Parsons, 2016

Synonyms
- Amphidromus (Syndromus) alicetandiasae J. Parsons, 2016 alternative representation

= Amphidromus alicetandiasae =

Species of snail

Amphidromus alicetandiasae is a species of air-breathing land snail, a terrestrial pulmonate gastropod mollusc in the family Camaenidae.

== Habitat ==
This species lives on the stem of trees.

== Distribution ==
Indonesia, Kalimantan Island.

== Etymology ==
The name is in honour of Alice Tandias, wife of Steven Lie, a landsnail enthusiast from Sumatra.
