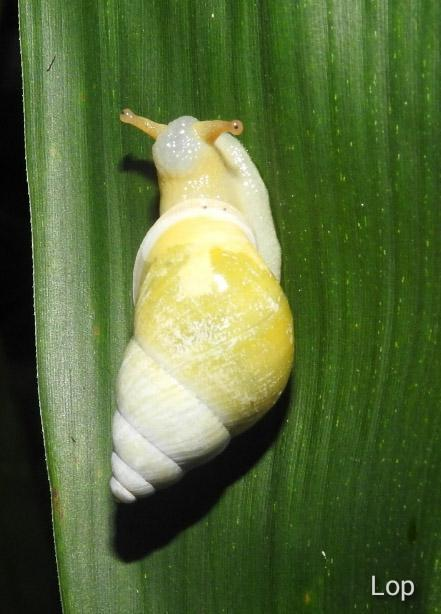
- Live specimen of Amphidromus sylheticus

Scientific classification
- Kingdom: Animalia
- Phylum: Mollusca
- Class: Gastropoda
- Order: Stylommatophora
- Family: Camaenidae
- Genus: Amphidromus
- Species: A. sylheticus

Binomial name
- Amphidromus sylheticus (Reeve, 1849)

Synonyms
- Amphidromus sinensis, var. sylhetica (Benson), Nevill, 1878; Bulimus sylheticus Reeve, 1849 superseded combination; Bulimus (Amphidromus) sylheticus Pfeiffer, 1856

= Amphidromus sylheticus =

Species of gastropod

Amphidromus sylheticus is a species of air-breathing, arboreal land snails in the family Camaenidae.

== Distribution ==
This species is endemic to Bangladesh.

== Description ==
The height of the shell attains 26 mm, its diameter 15 mm.

The sinistral shell is umbilicate, ovate-conic, polished, and finely striated, with the initial whorl weakly punctate. It is greenish-yellow below the periphery, fading to pale yellow above and on the spire, with the early whorls and apex whitish. The shell comprises 5.5 slightly convex whorls, the body whorl being weakly convex above and very convex, full, and saccate below. The aperture is ovate, oblique, and slightly brown or ochre-tinted within. The peristome is white and reflexed. The columella has a slightly convex inner edge, is broadly dilated, and guttered at its junction with the shell body. The dilated edge overhangs a rather large umbilicus and is slightly thickened as it extends onto the parietal wall. The parietal callus is thin and translucent.
