= Amphidromus verbinneni =

Scientific classification
- Kingdom: Animalia
- Phylum: Mollusca
- Class: Gastropoda
- Order: Stylommatophora
- Family: Camaenidae
- Genus: Amphidromus
- Species: A. verbinneni

Binomial name
- Amphidromus verbinneni Segers, 2020

Synonyms
- Amphidromus (Syndromus) verbinneni Segers, 2020 · alternative representation

Species of snail

Amphidromus verbinneni is a species of air-breathing land snail, a terrestrial pulmonate gastropod mollusc in the family Camaenidae.

== Distribution ==
This species is endemic to Vietnam.
