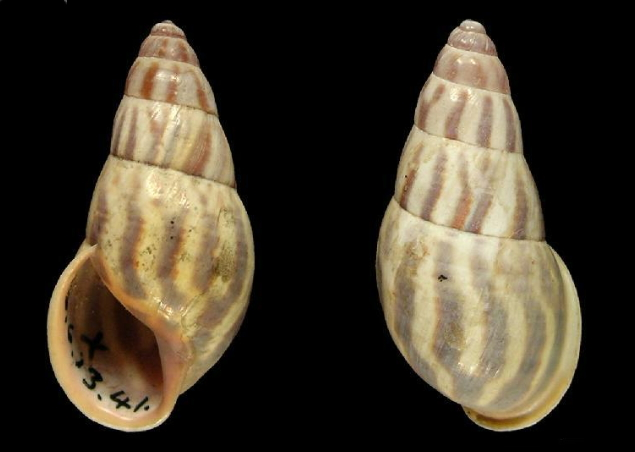
- Shell of Amphidromus sumbaensis (lectotype at the Natural History Museum, London)

Scientific classification
- Kingdom: Animalia
- Phylum: Mollusca
- Class: Gastropoda
- Order: Stylommatophora
- Family: Camaenidae
- Genus: Amphidromus
- Species: A. sumbaensis

Binomial name
- Amphidromus sumbaensis Fulton, 1896

= Amphidromus sumbaensis =

Species of gastropod

Amphidromus sumbaensis is a species of air-breathing land snail, a terrestrial pulmonate gastropod mollusc in the family Camaenidae.

== Description ==
The length of the shell attains 34 mm, its diameter 16 mm.

(Original description) The sinistral shell is oblong-conic, narrowly perforate, and solid. It consists of 6.75 convex whorls. The first two whorls are pale purple. The lower whorls are cream to pale yellow below, ornamented with oblique bluish-grey stripes, which are intersected on the upper whorls by interrupted spiral lines of a darker color. The apex is dark brown. The outer lip is slightly expanded and reflected, pale purple. The columella is thick, purple, and connected to the lip by a thin, red callus.

== Distribution ==
The type species was found on Sumba Island, Indonesia.
