= List of non-marine molluscs of Myanmar =

Location of Myanmar

The non-marine molluscs of Myanmar are a part of the fauna of Myanmar (wildlife of Myanmar). A number of species of molluscs are found in the wild in Myanmar.

== Freshwater gastropods ==
Freshwater gastropods in Myanmar include:

Viviparidae

- Angulyagra oxytropis (Benson, 1836)
- Bellamya bengalensis (Lamarck, 1882)

Assimineidae

- Assiminea beddomeana Nevill, 1880
- Assiminea brevicula Pfeiffer, 1854
- Assiminea francesiae Wood, 1828
- Assiminea microsculpta Nevill, 1880

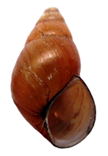
Bithynia siamensis shell

Bithyniidae

- Bithynia moreletiana Nevill, 1877
- Bithynia pulchella Benson, 1836
- Bithynia pygmaea Preston, 1908
- Bithynia siamensis Lea, 1856

Ellobiidae

- Auriculastra subula (Qouy & Gaimard, 1832) – in brackish waters

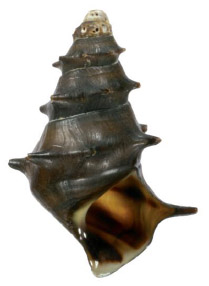
Brotia pagodula shell

Pachychilidae

- Brotia pagodula (Gould, 1847)
- Faunus ater (Linnaeus, 1758)
- Sulcospira housei (I. Lea, 1856)

Lymnaeidae

- Austropeplea viridis (Quoy & Gaimard, 1832)

== Land gastropods ==
Land gastropods in Myanmar include:

Cyclophoridae

- Cyclophorus affinis Theobald, 1858
- Cyclophorus aurantiacus pernobilis Gould, 1844
- Cyclophorus expansus (Pfeiffer, 1853)
- Cyclophorus fulguratus Pfeiffer, 1852
- Cyclophorus haughtoni Theobald, 1858
- Cyclophorus speciosus (Philippi, 1847)
- Cyclophorus zebrinus (Benson, 1836)
- Scabrina basisulcata (E. von Martens, 1897)
- Scabrina calyx (Benson, 1856)
- Scabrina hispidula (W. T. Blanford, 1863)
- Scabrina inglisianus (Stoliczka, 1871)

Streptaxidae – 10 species of Streptaxidae are known from Myanmar

- Perrottetia
- Huttonella bicolor (Hutton, 1834)

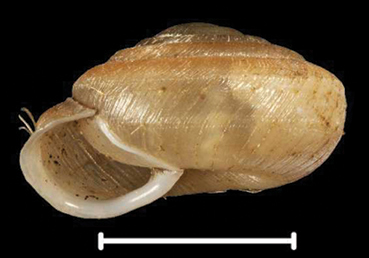
Endothyrella plectostoma shell

Plectopylidae

- Chersaecia
- Endothyrella plectostoma (Benson, 1836)
- Hunyadiscus andersoni (W. Blanford, 1869)

Ariophantidae

- Hemiplecta humphreysiana
- Megaustenia siamense (Haines, 1858)
- Syama primiscua Godwin-Austen

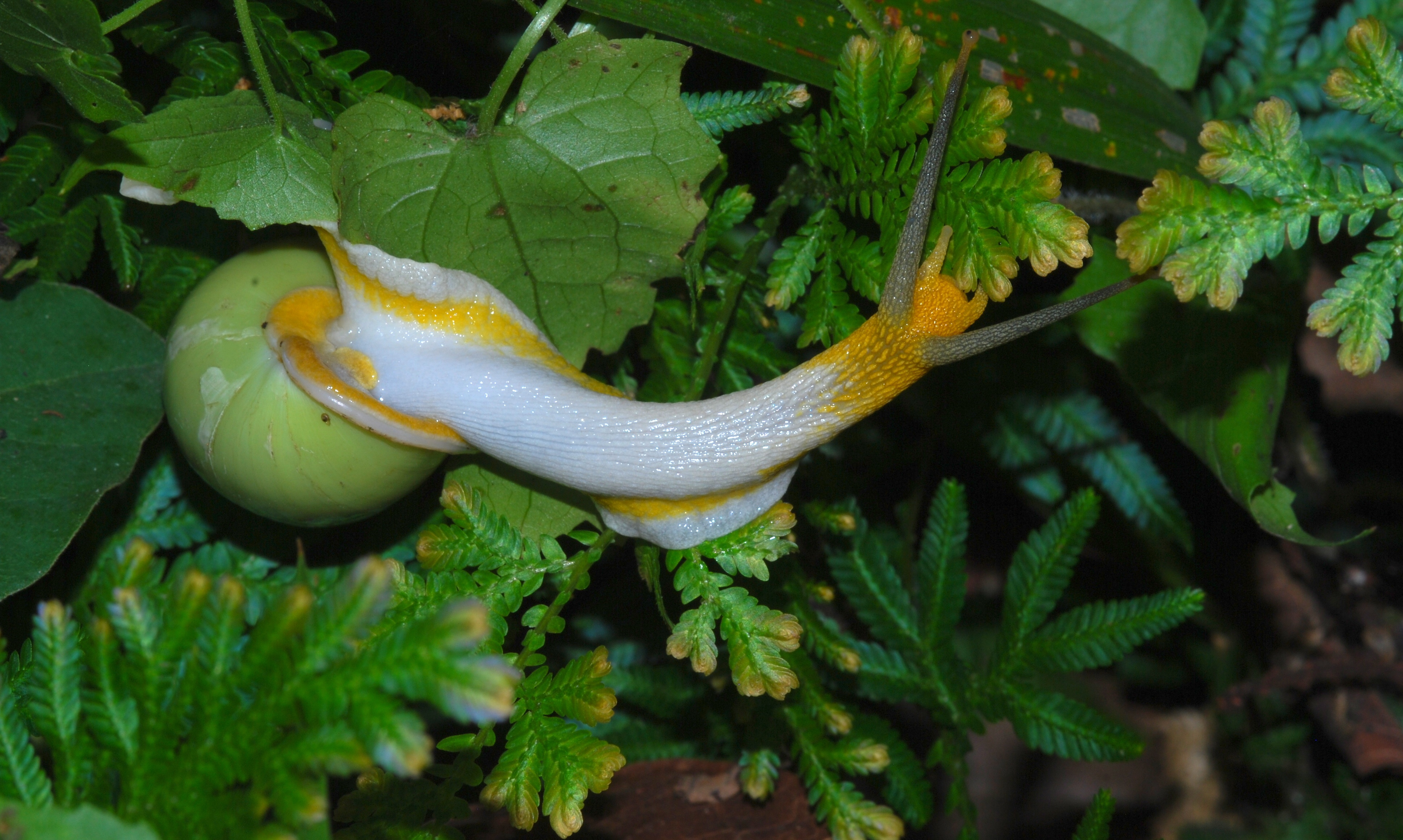
Amphidromus atricallosus perakensis

Camaenidae

- Amphidromus atricallosus (Gould, 1843)
- Amphidromus lepidus (Gould, 1856)
- Amphidromus moniliferus (Gould, 1846)
- Amphidromus sinensis
  - Amphidromus sinensis gracilis Fulton, 1896
  - Amphidromus sinensis vicaria Fulton, 1896
- Amphidromus theobaldianus (Benson, 1857)

== Freshwater bivalves ==
Freshwater bivalves in Myanmar include:

Unionidae

- Sinanodonta woodiana (Lea, 1834) – non-indigenous, firstly reported in 2017

Sphaeriidae

- Pisidium clarkeanum G. et H. Nevill, 1871
- Pisidium nevillianum Theobald, 1876

== See also ==
- List of marine molluscs of Myanmar

Lists of molluscs of surrounding countries:

- List of non-marine molluscs of India
- List of non-marine molluscs of Bangladesh
- List of non-marine molluscs of China
- List of non-marine molluscs of Laos
- List of non-marine molluscs of Thailand
