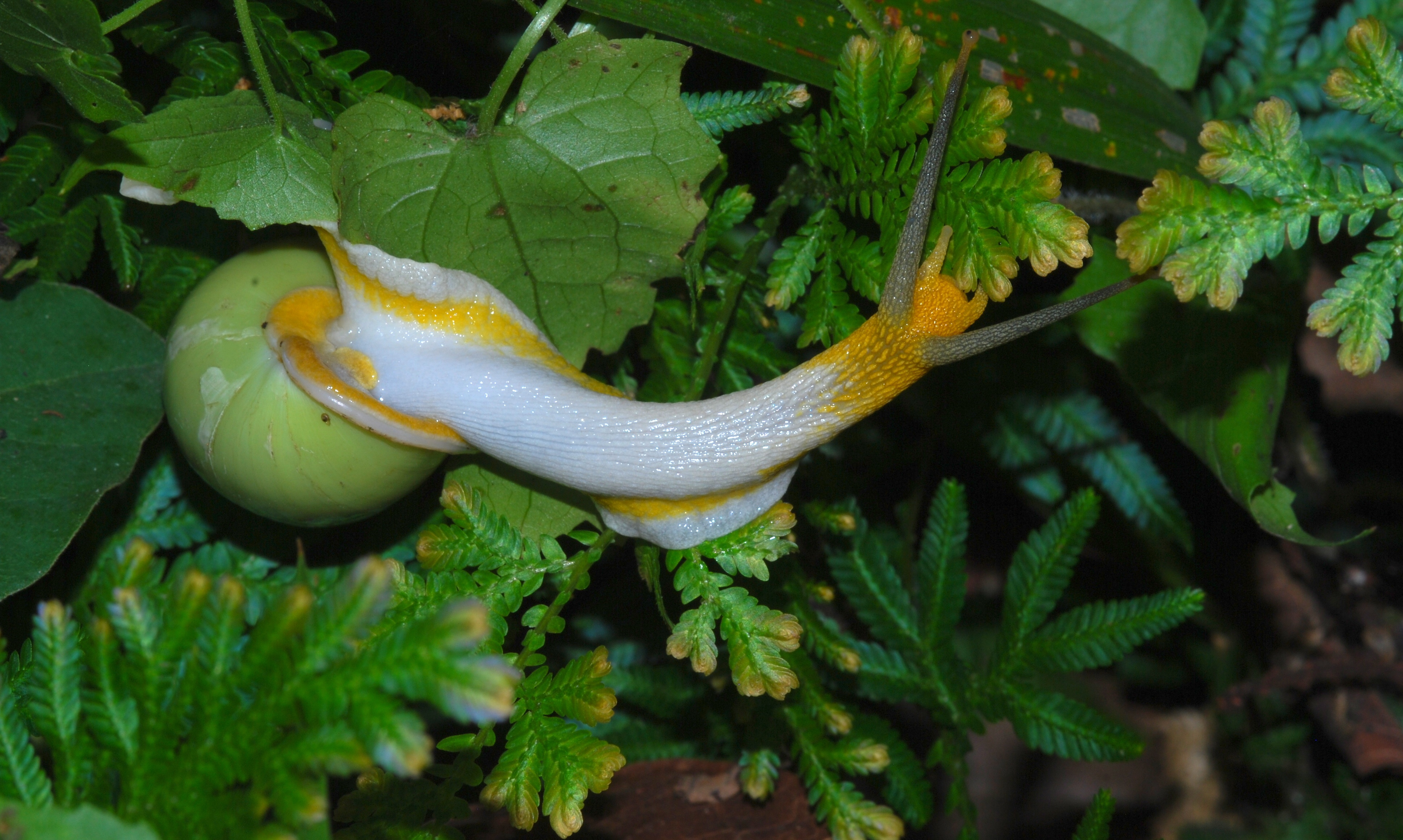
- Dorsal view of Amphidromus atricallosus perakensis
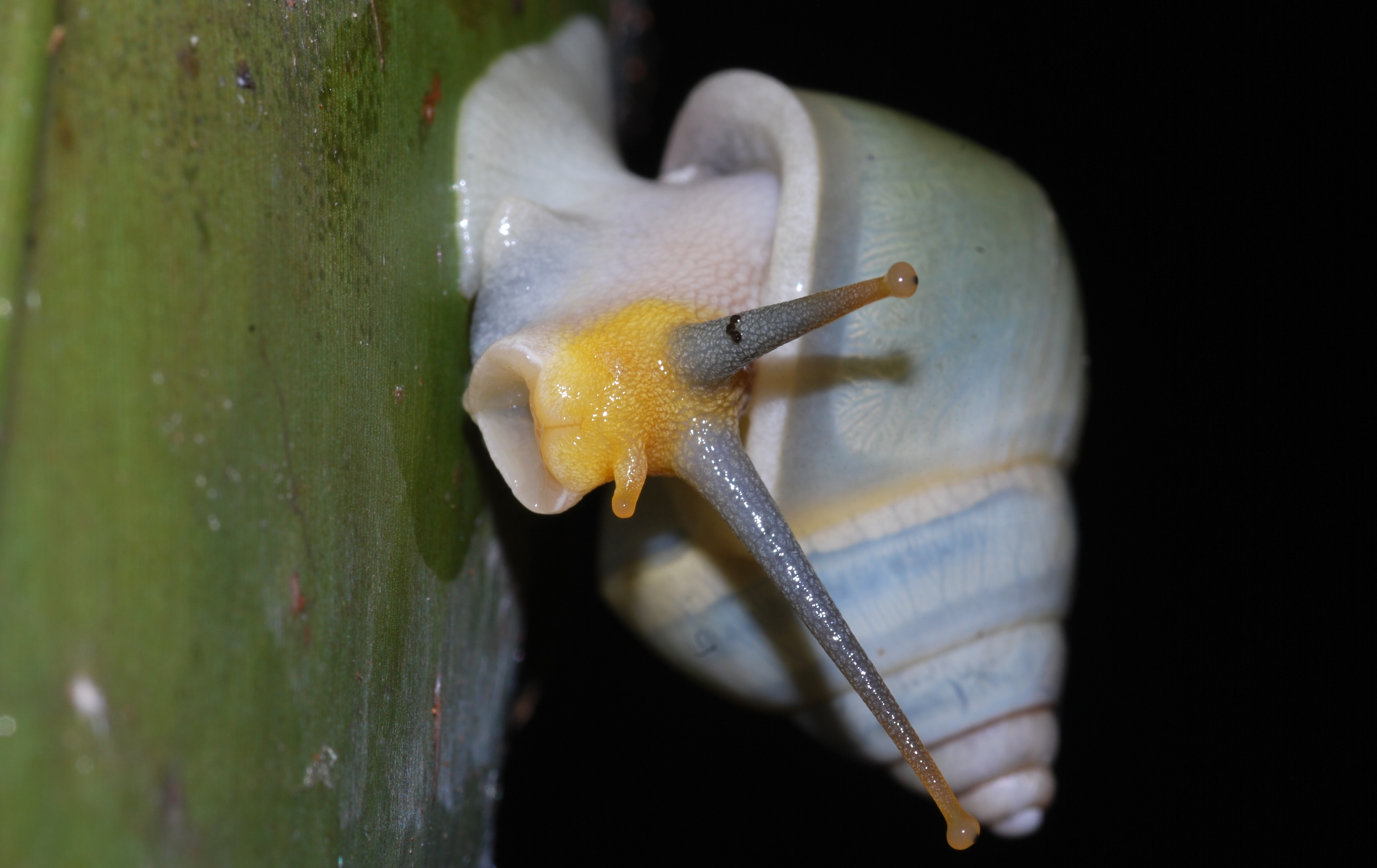
- Frontal view of Amphidromus atricallosus perakensis

Scientific classification
- Kingdom: Animalia
- Phylum: Mollusca
- Class: Gastropoda
- Order: Stylommatophora
- Family: Camaenidae
- Genus: Amphidromus
- Species: A. atricallosus

Binomial name
- Amphidromus atricallosus (Gould, 1843)

Synonyms
- Bulimus atricallosus A. Gould, 1843; Bulimus eques L. Pfeiffer, 1857; Amphidromus eques (L. Pfeiffer, 1857)

= Amphidromus atricallosus =

Species of gastropod

Amphidromus atricallosus is a species of air-breathing, arboreal land snails in the family Camaenidae.

== Subspecies ==
- Amphidromus atricallosus atricallosus (Gould, 1843)
- Amphidromus atricallosus classiarius Sutcharit & Panha, 2006
- Amphidromus atricallosus perakensis Fulton, 1901
- Amphidromus atricallosus temasek Tan, Chan & Panha, 2011

Synonyms

- Amphidromus atricallosus leucoxanthus (von Martens, 1864): synonym of Amphidromus leucoxanthus (E. von Martens, 1864) (unaccepted rank)
- Amphidromus atricallosus vovanae Thach, 2019: synonym of Amphidromus comes (L. Pfeiffer, 1861) (unaccepted > junior subjective synonym)

== Distribution ==
Distribution of Amphidromus atricallosus and its subspecies include:

- Southern Myanmar
- Southern and eastern Thailand including Sakaeo Province, Thailand.
- Widely distributed in Peninsular Malaysia.
- Singapore

== Description ==
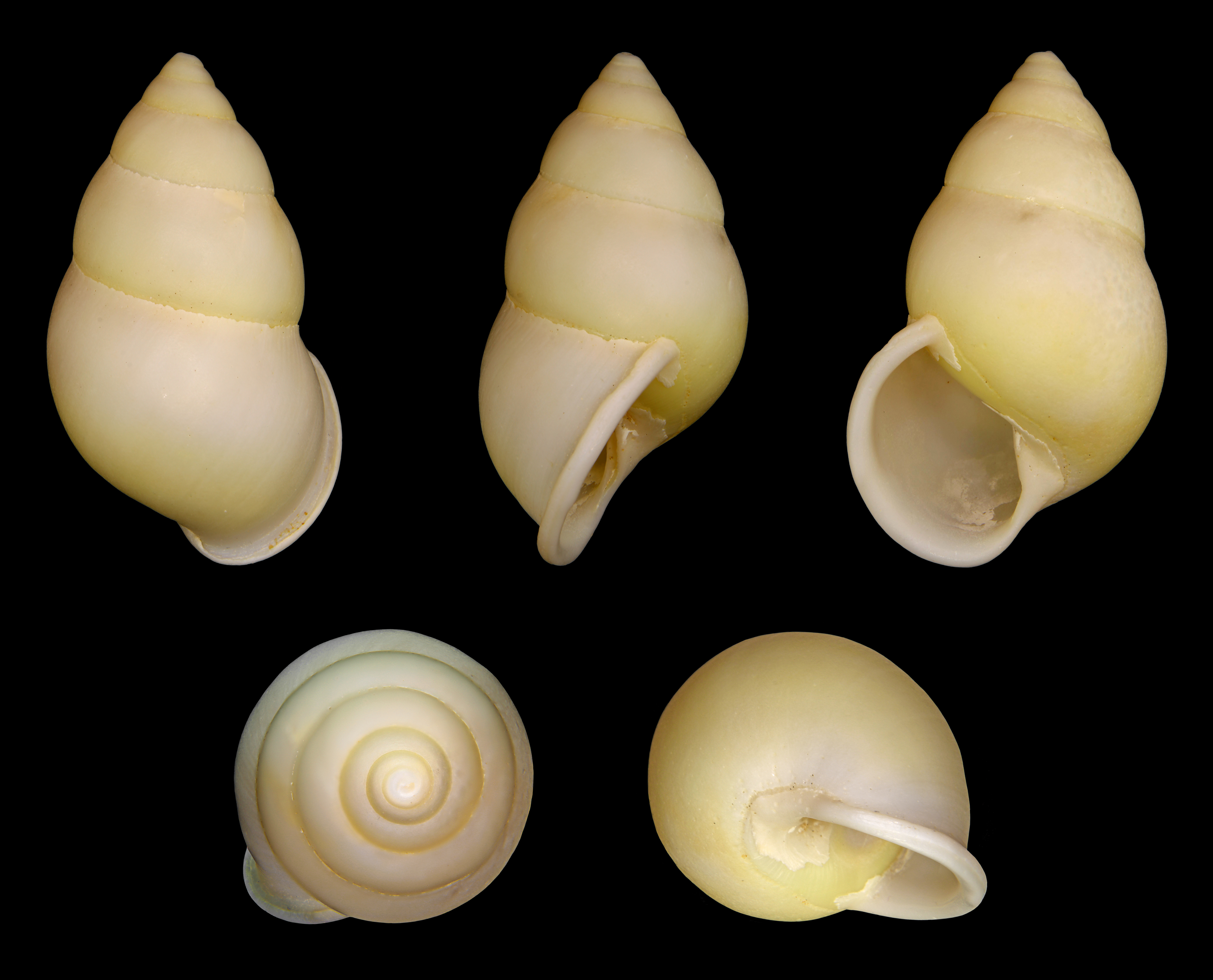
Amphidromus atricallosus leucoxanthus shell.

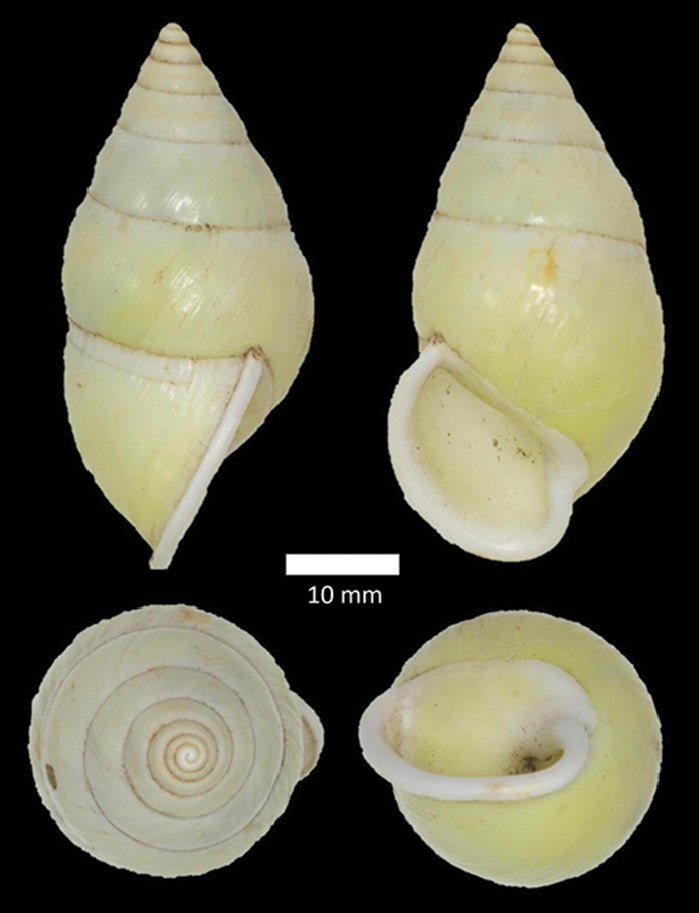
Amphidromus atricallosus perakensis shell.

The height of the shell attains 59 mm, its diameter 25 mm.

This imperforate shell is elongated ovate, solid, smooth, and glossy, with a sulfur-yellow coloration. It comprises seven moderately convex whorls, slightly constricted near the suture. The body whorl constitutes nearly two-thirds of the shell's length. The aperture is ovate-lunate, somewhat angular and slightly effuse at the base. The lips are white, broadly revolute, and not flattened. The columella is white, and the callus uniting the peristome extremities, as far as visible within the shell, is pitch-black. A line of the same color, indicating a former growth stage, extends from its center across the penultimate whorl.
