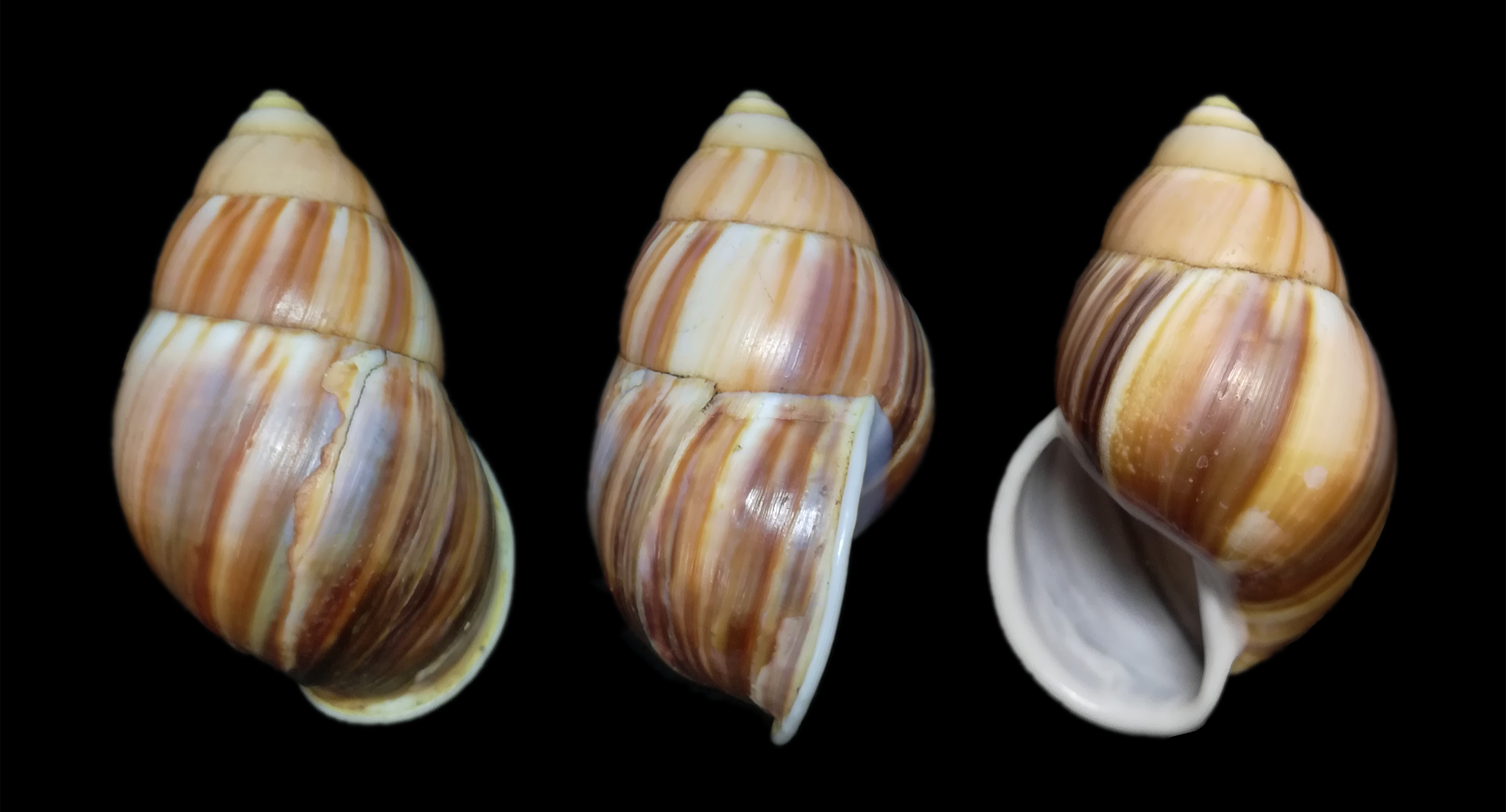

Scientific classification
- Kingdom: Animalia
- Phylum: Mollusca
- Class: Gastropoda
- Order: Stylommatophora
- Family: Camaenidae
- Genus: Amphidromus
- Species: A. javanicus

Binomial name
- Amphidromus javanicus (G.B. Sowerby, 1833)

Synonyms
- Bulimus javanicus G. B. Sowerby I, 1833; Bulinus javanicus G. B. Sowerby I, 1833 superseded combination

= Amphidromus javanicus =

Species of large-sized air-breathing tree snail

Amphidromus javanicus is a species of large-sized air-breathing tree snail, an arboreal gastropod mollusk in the family Camaenidae.

It is closely related to Cambodian, Thailand's, and Laos's Amphidromus xiengensis. This explains the [color similarities of the two species.

== Distribution ==
Java, Indonesia but it is most commonly found in Northwest Java near Depok and in Depok.

== Habitat ==
Dense jungles, banana groves, near roads, bamboo pockets, and in muddy fields.

== Conservation status ==
The Amphidromus javanicus is not listed on the IUCN Red List but is threatened due to habitat loss, deforestation, and hunting for traditional Javanese escargot. As a lesser-known species, this gastropod doesn't have any conservation efforts underway to protect it.

== Characteristics ==
This snail is known for its vibrant, helicoid shell, typically 3–5 cm long. This is the common size, but the size depends on the snail's environment. Its shell is light brown with dark brown stripes and medium stripes in the middle.

The shell can be either sinistral or dextral, imperforate or nearly so, and solid, presenting an ovate-pyramidal shape. Its surface is closely streaked with dull crimson, chestnut, and blackish markings on an olivaceous buff, ochre-tinted, or livid ground, with the streaks often breaking into a mottled pattern. The early whorls and a border below the sutures appear white, pink, or pale. Several blackish varices, followed by whitish streaks, are generally present, but inconspicuous within the overall streaked pattern. The surface is glossy and distinctly striate. The spire appears rather straightly conic; comprising six to seven and a half slightly and equally convex whorls, separated by moderately impressed sutures marked with a white hairline. The aperture is but slightly oblique and ovate, appearing bluish inside. The peristome is white, expanded, and subreflexed with a blunt edge; the columella is nearly straight; and the parietal callus is white and deeply entering.

== Behaviour ==
This snail's behaviour varies from season to season. They regularly appear during the wet season right after rain occurs, but in the time periods, wet season or not, where there isn't rain or when it is not right after rain, they will hide under rocks and wooden sticks, and some might even burrow underground to avoid drying up. These snails form a substance around their shell in order to keep moisture inside.

== Diet ==
This Amphidromus snail feeds on leafs, dry, living, or dead. But they usually feed on healthy ones that are still bright green.

== Taxonomy ==
This invertebrate was discovered by John Edward Sowerby in 1833, on a lesser-known expedition he went on to discover another not very lesser-known Javanese creature. When John Edward Sowerby discovered it in 1841, it was very lesser-known at the time, and no tribes had ever known what it was.

== Reproduction ==
The Amphidromus javanicus snails exhibit fascinating reproductive behaviour characteristics of the Amphidromus genus. Hermaphroditic creatures, these land snails possess both male and female reproductive organs, which allows for flexible mating strategies. They engage in reciprocity-induced mating, where two snails exchange sperm, ensuring genetic diversity. Mating can be influenced by environmental factors such as humidity and temperature, as these conditions affect their activity and readiness for reproduction.
