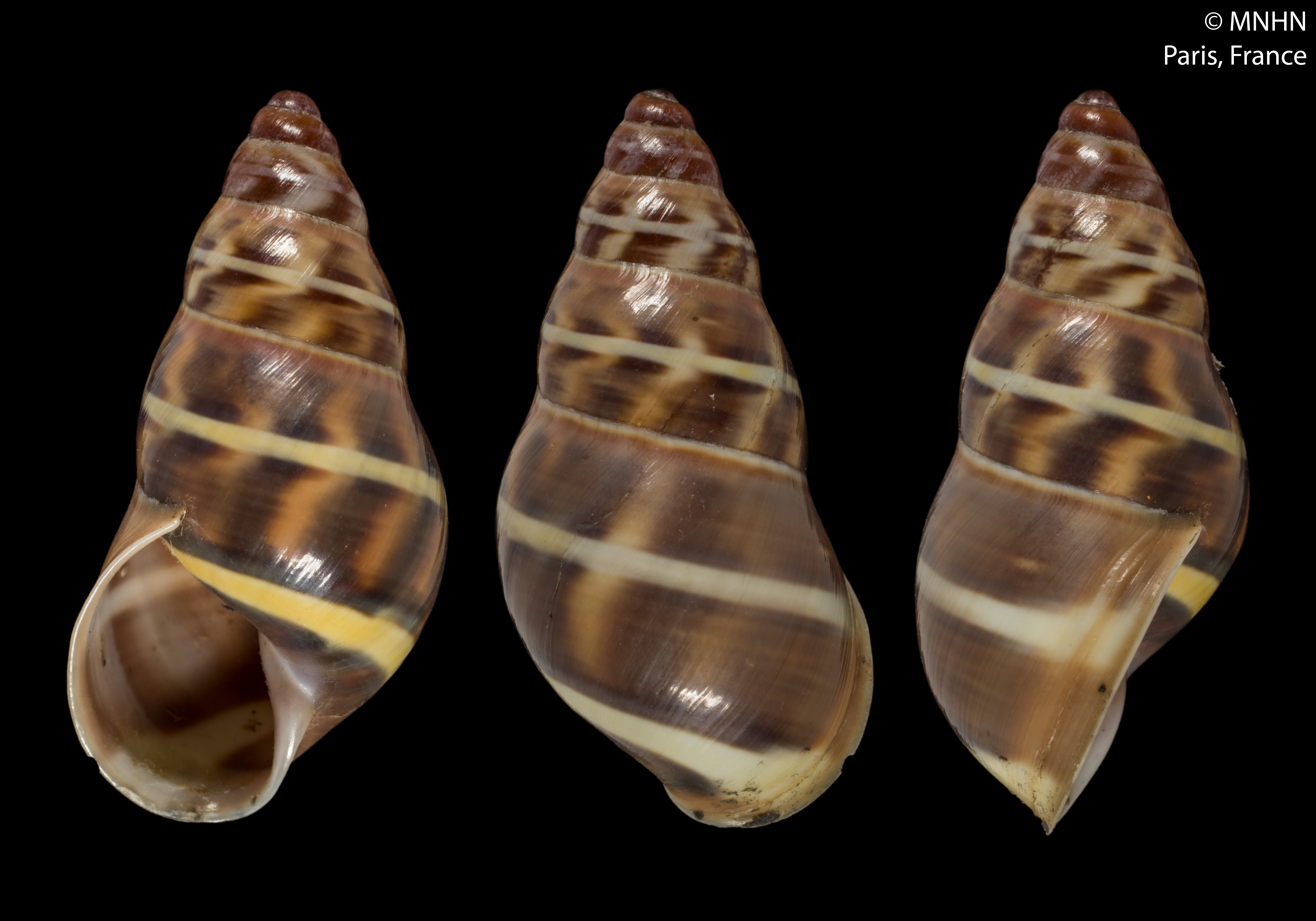
- Amphidromus contrarius rolfei

Scientific classification
- Kingdom: Animalia
- Phylum: Mollusca
- Class: Gastropoda
- Order: Stylommatophora
- Family: Camaenidae
- Genus: Amphidromus
- Species: A. contrarius

Binomial name
- Amphidromus contrarius (Müller, 1774)

Synonyms
- Amphidromus (Syndromus) contrarius (O. F. Müller, 1774) alternative representation; Amphidromus contrarius floresi Haltenorth & Jaeckel, 1940 (invalid; not Bartsch, 1928); Helix contraria O.F. Müller, 1774; Helix contrarius O. F. Müller, 1774 (original combination)

= Amphidromus contrarius =

Species of gastropod

Amphidromus contrarius is a species of air-breathing land snail, a terrestrial pulmonate gastropod mollusk in the family Camaenidae.

Amphidromus contrarius is the type species of the subgenus Syndromus.

== Subspecies ==
- Amphidromus contrarius baaguiae Forcart, 1936
- Amphidromus contrarius baweanicus Fruhstorfer, 1905
- Amphidromus contrarius maculata Fulton, 1896
- Amphidromus contrarius hanieli B. Rensch, 1931
- Amphidromus contrarius nikiensis B. Rensch, 1931
- Amphidromus contrarius rolfei Thach, 2018

Synonyms

- Amphidromus contrarius crassa Fulton, 1899 : synonym of Amphidromus crassus Fulton, 1899
- Amphidromus contrarius floresi Haltenorth & Jaeckel, 1940 : synonym of Amphidromus contrarius (O. F. Müller, 1774) (invalid; not Bartsch, 1928)
- Amphidromus contrarius maculatus Fulton, 1896 : synonym of Amphidromus maculatus Fulton, 1896 (superseded combination)
- Amphidromus contrarius multifasciatus Fulton, 1896 : synonym of Amphidromus xiengensis Morlet, 1891 (unaccepted > junior subjective synonym)
- Amphidromus contrarius var. crassa Fulton, 1899: synonym of Amphidromus crassus Fulton, 1899
- Amphidromus contrarius var. maculata Fulton, 1896: synonym of Amphidromus maculatus Fulton, 1896
- Amphidromus contrarius var. multifasciata Fulton, 1896: synonym of Amphidromus xiengensis Morlet, 1891 (nomen nudum)

== Description ==
(Original description in Latin) The white shell is glossy, thinner and smaller than Amphidromus inversus (O. F. Müller, 1774). The shell contains sx sinistral whorls exhibiting transverse, fulvous, slightly undulate streaks and a double white spiral band, the lower band wider and interrupted. The apex is black. The aperture is ovate, white with translucent streaks. The parietal wall is yellowish. The outer lip is reflected and is pure white. The axis is narrowly perforate, the perforation partially obscured by a wide, adjacent lamella-like extension of the columellar lip, giving the appearance of being closed.

The shell is umbilicate or perforate, sinistral, and oblong turreted, appearing thin but moderately solid, polished, and glossy, faintly striatulate above, and somewhat coarsely wrinkle-striate on the base. Its ground color is a pale flesh-tint, becoming white on the spire, and is flammulated with oblique purple-brown stripes that do not reach the suture above and are bisected by a yellow band (white on the spire) that revolves midway between the sutures, frequently having dark borders on the body whorl. The flames terminate abruptly at a wide yellow band that revolves below the periphery and is bordered above and below with narrow dark bands; a large flesh-colored basal area is present below this band. Comprising about six quite convex whorls, the first one is black; the penultimate and last whorls are strongly convex; the suture appears impressed and is marked by a white line below, which is often bordered by an indistinct pink band. The aperture is small and oblique, showing the bands within; the peristome is white both inside and out, reflexed, and thin. The columella is oblique, its outer margin triangularly reflexed above and continues some distance as a thickened ledge upon the parietal wall. The parietal callus is thin, showing the bands through it, and is thickened at the edge below and near the posterior angle, where a subtriangular tubercle is present, separated from the termination of the outer lip by a deep but narrow channel that continues along the suture inside.

== Distribution ==
Distribution of Amphidromus contrarius include central Timor in Indonesia.

== Description ==
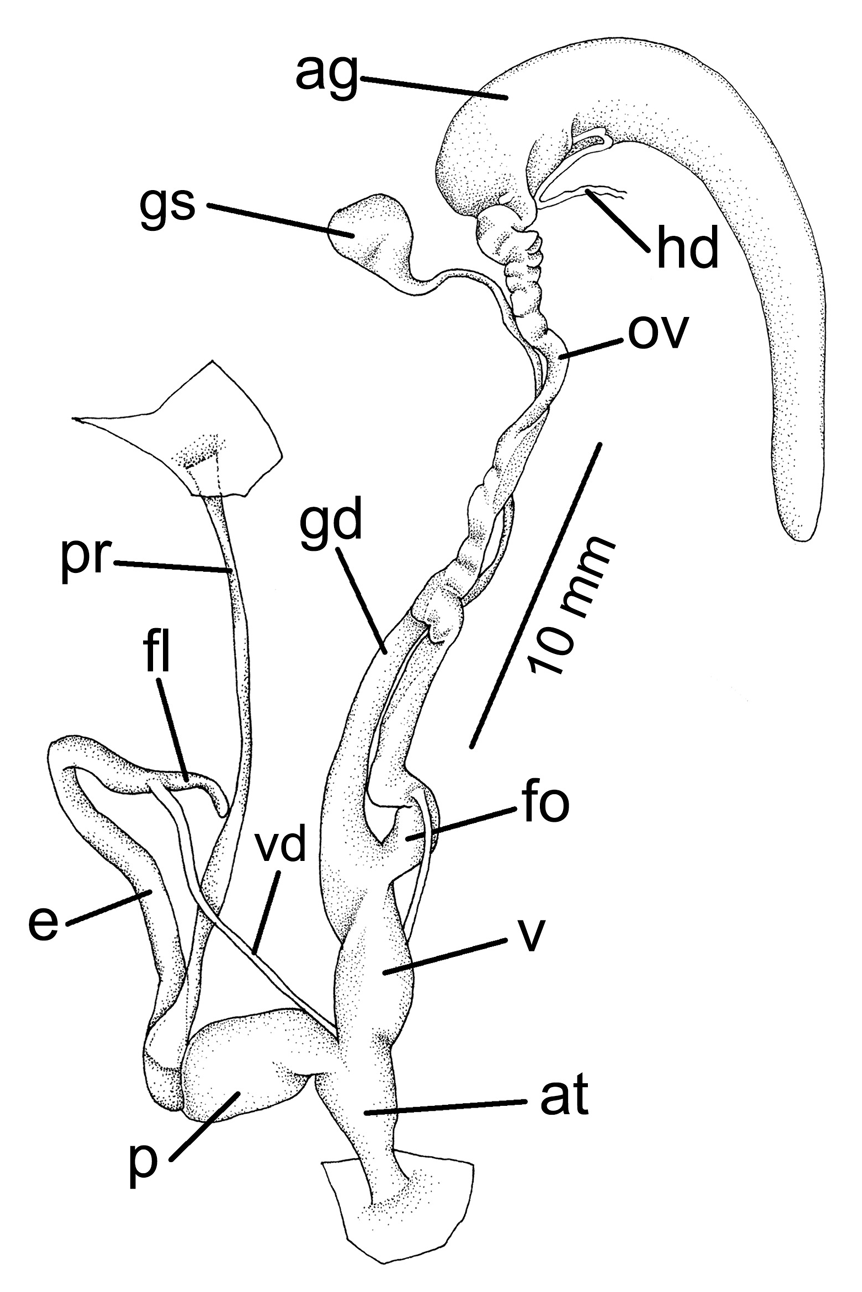
Drawing of a reproductive system of Amphidromus contrarius.
