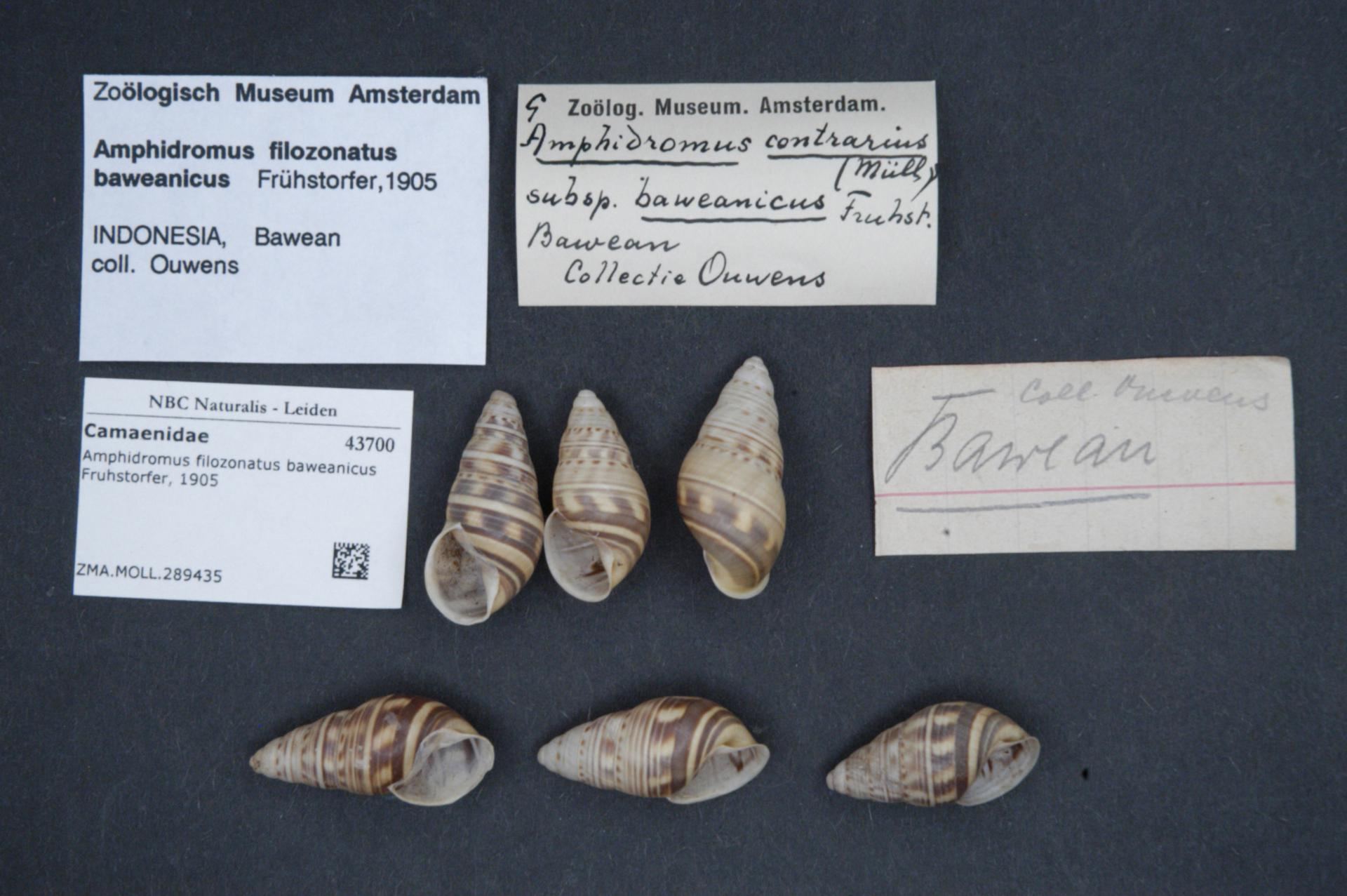
- Shells of Amphidromus filizonatus (specimens at Naturalis Biodiversity Center)

Scientific classification
- Kingdom: Animalia
- Phylum: Mollusca
- Class: Gastropoda
- Order: Stylommatophora
- Family: Camaenidae
- Genus: Amphidromus
- Species: A. filozonatus

Binomial name
- Amphidromus filozonatus (E. von Martens, 1867)

Synonyms
- Amphidromus (Syndromus) filozonatus (E. von Martens, 1867) alternative representation; Bulimus filozonatus E. von Martens, 1867 (original combination)

= Amphidromus filozonatus =

Species of snail in the family Camaenidae

Amphidromus filozonatus is a species of medium-sized air-breathing tree snail, an arboreal gastropod mollusk in the family Camaenidae.

Subspecies

- Amphidromus filozonatus filozonatus (E. von Martens, 1867)
- Amphidromus filozonatus jucundus Fulton, 1896

Smaller than typical filozonatus, the shell appears rather more solid. The body whorl exhibits a grayish-brown color with a yellow band around its lower part, while the upper whorls are white with dark brown stripes that are interrupted by a narrow pale yellow band.

== Description ==
The length of the shell attains 35 mm, its diameter 17 mm.

(Original description in Latin) The sinistral shell is elongate-conical. It presents a somewhat solid structure and a slightly finely striated, glossy surface. The body whorl displays a grayish-brown coloration, adorned with narrow whitish bands (and one black-articulated band). All the upper whorls appear yellowish-whitish, exhibiting blackish, somewhat rhombic spots that are interrupted by a band, with the uppermost whorls being white and the very apex black. The aperture is oblong-ovate, angled below, and brown on the inside, occupying about 2/5 of the shell's length. The peristome feels somewhat thickened and white, showing a shortly reflected lip and a scarcely noticeable parietal callus. The columellar margin appears somewhat straight and dilated.

(Description by H.C. Fulton) The whorls appear less convex than in Amphidromus contrarius. The ground color is either light or dark brown, featuring one or more narrow lighter-colored bands that encircle the whorls, and sometimes displaying a reticulated band at the periphery, which continues at the suture of the upper whorls.

== Habitat ==
This species lives in trees.

== Distribution ==
The type locality of this species is Java and Sulawesi, Indonesia.
