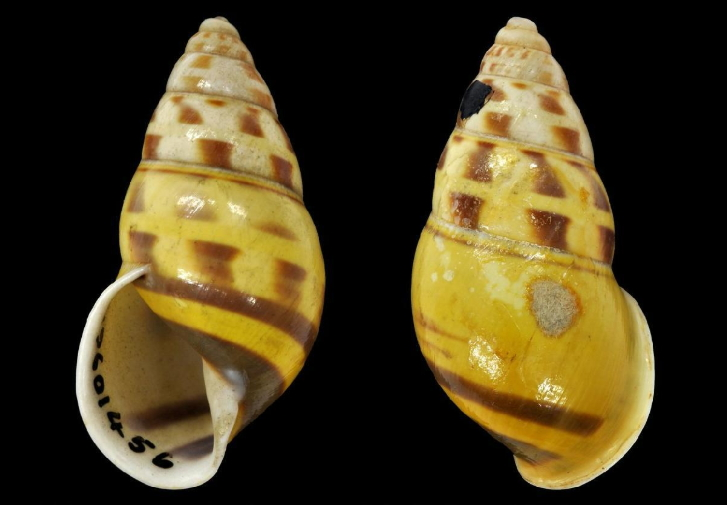
- Shell of Amphidromus maculatus maculatus (lectotype at the Natural History Museum, London)

Scientific classification
- Kingdom: Animalia
- Phylum: Mollusca
- Class: Gastropoda
- Order: Stylommatophora
- Family: Camaenidae
- Genus: Amphidromus
- Species: A. maculatus

Binomial name
- Amphidromus maculatus Fulton, 1896

Synonyms
- Amphidromus (Syndromus) maculatus Fulton, 1896 alternative representation; Amphidromus contrarius maculatus Fulton, 1896 superseded combination; Amphidromus contrarius var. maculata Fulton, 1896

= Amphidromus maculatus =

Species of gastropod

Amphidromus maculatus is a species of air-breathing land snail, a terrestrial pulmonate gastropod mollusc in the family Camaenidae.

Subspecies

- Amphidromus maculatus bungiensis Pilsbry, 1900
- Amphidromus maculatus maculatus Fulton, 1896

== Description ==
The length of the shell attains 37 mm, its diameter 20 mm.

(Original description) This shell is shorter and somewhat thinner than Amphidromus contrarius, with less convex whorls. The interrupted markings of this species are smaller and more widely spaced, fading on the body whorl. The last half-whorl is plain, except for two basal bands. A spiral band of equidistant small brown spots encircles the suture of the upper whorls just below.

== Distribution ==
The type species was found on Sulawesi, Indonesia.
