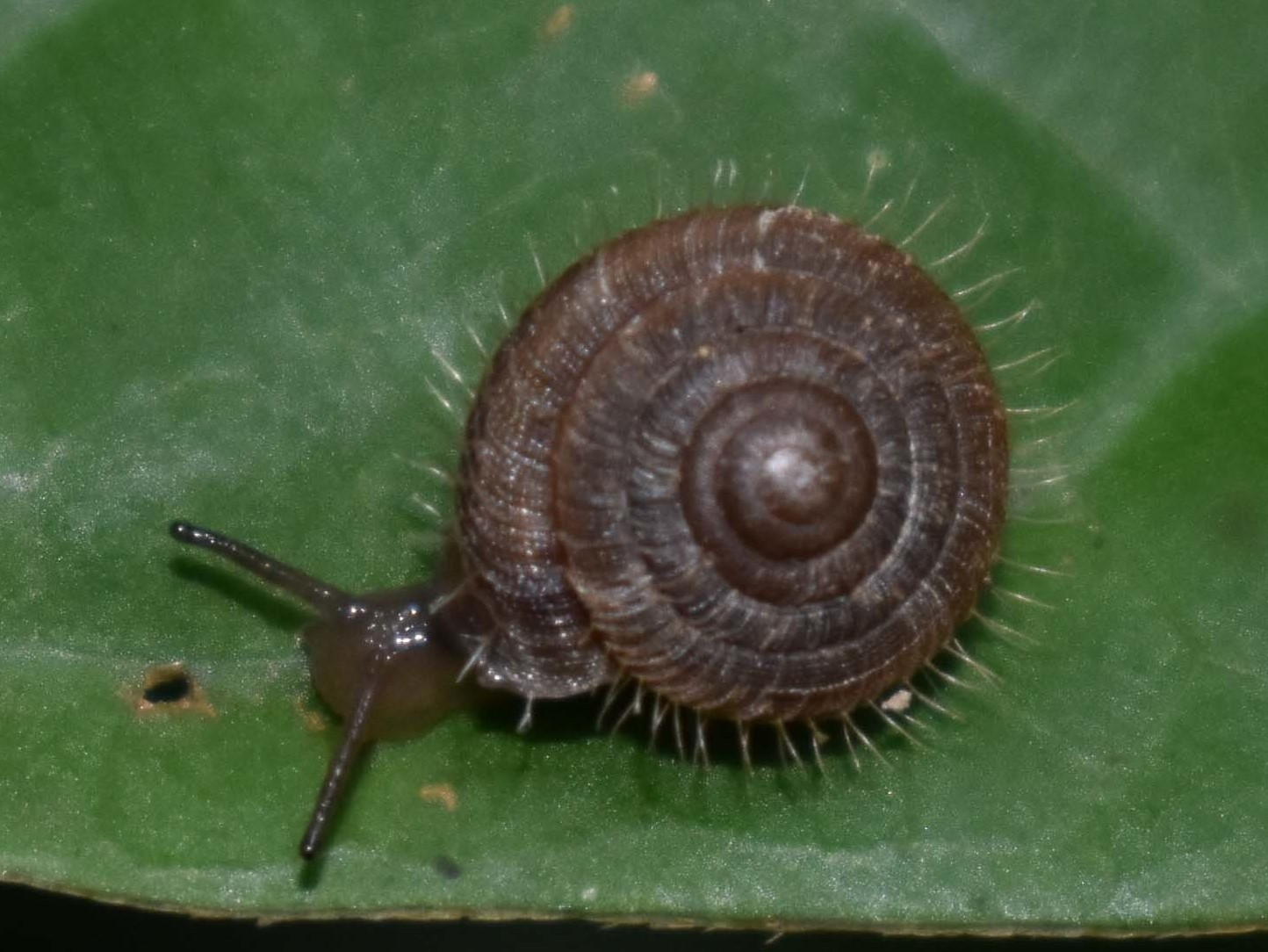

Scientific classification
- Kingdom: Animalia
- Phylum: Mollusca
- Class: Gastropoda
- Order: Stylommatophora
- Family: Plectopylidae
- Genus: Endothyrella
- Species: E. plectostoma

Binomial name
- Endothyrella plectostoma (Benson, 1836)

Synonyms
- List: Helix (Helicodonta) plectostoma Benson, 1836; Helix (Plectopylis) plectostoma (Benson, 1836); Plectopylis plectostoma (Benson, 1836); Plectopylis (Endothyra) plectostoma (Benson, 1836); Plectopylis (Endothyrella) plectostoma (Benson, 1836)

= Endothyrella plectostoma =

Species of gastropod

Endothyrella plectostoma is a species of air-breathing land snail, a terrestrial pulmonate gastropod mollusc in the family Plectopylidae.

== Taxonomy ==
Endothyrella plectostoma is the type species of the genus Endothyrella. This species was described under the name Helix plectostoma by William Henry Benson in 1836. It was the first described species that is currently placed in the family Plectopylidae.

== Distribution ==
The distribution of Endothyrella plectostoma includes India, Bangladesh and Myanmar. It is the only species from the genus Endothyrella that was reported from Myanmar.

== Description ==
The most important shell characters for identification of Endothyrella plectostoma include: very narrow umbilicus; there are five rows of hairs; there is present horizontal parietal plica.

Endothyrella plectostoma has a very small, sinistral shell with very narrow umbilicus. The dorsal surface is conical. Hairs are standing in five rows on the body whorl. Palatal plicae is more or less straight. The 4th and 5th plica is divided. The lamella is slightly curved, with short lower and long upper elongation in anterior direction. There are two denticles posteriorly, one above and one below.

The width of the shell is 8.1–9.0 mm. The height of the shell is 4.6–5.1 mm.

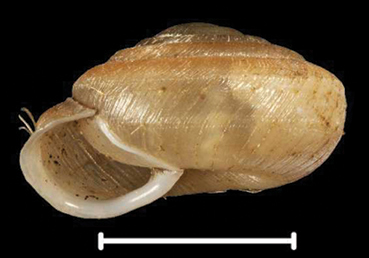
Apertural view, syntype. Scale bar is 5 mm.

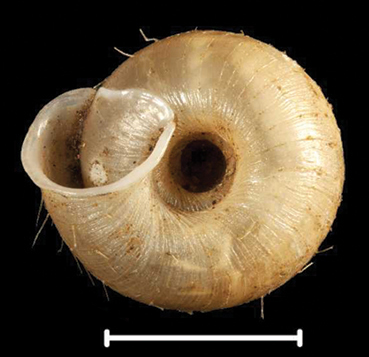
Umbilical view.

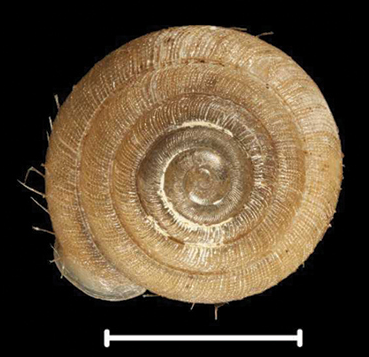
Apical view.

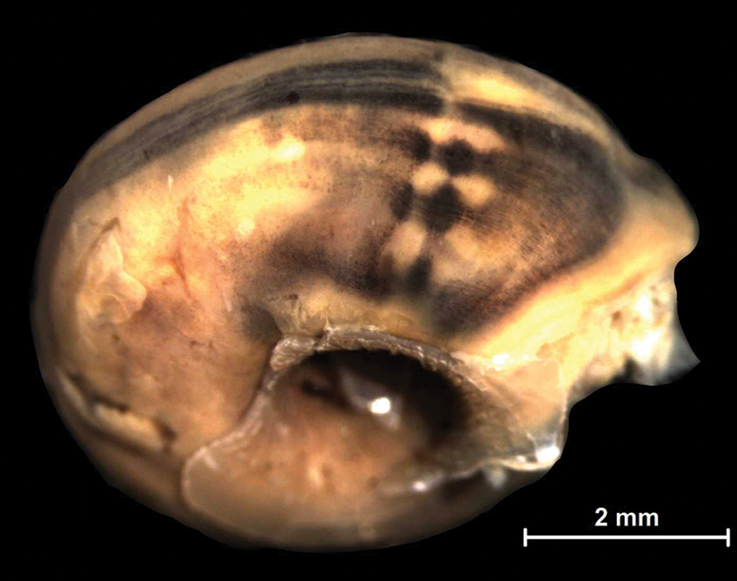
Coloration of the mantle of Endothyrella plectostoma. (Shell is removed.)

The radula and the reproductive system were described by Páll-Gergely et al. in 2015.

=== Similar species ===
The most similar species to Endothyrella plectostoma include Endothyrella affinis and Endothyrella sowerbyi. Endothyrella affinis and Endothyrella tricarinata are similar to Endothyrella plectostoma in the narrow umbilicus. All other Endothyrella species of similar size have wider umbilicus. Endothyrella plectostoma is usually smaller, darker than Endothyrella affinis, it has a horizontal, relatively long plica anterior to the lamella, and has the periostracal folds arranged on five spiral line. In contrast, Endothyrella affinis lacks the horizontal parietal plica and has four hair rows. Moreover, Endothyrella plectostoma has a narrower umbilicus and more elevated spire than Endothyrella affinis.

Endothyrella sowerbyi has a wider umbilicus and a thinner peristome than Endothyrella plectostoma. Moreover, the spire is lower and the dorsal side is rather domed in Endothyrella sowerbyi (conical in Endothyrella plectostoma), and the main parietal plica is weaker or missing in Endothyrella sowerbyi.

Endothyrella tricarinata differs from Endothyrella plectostoma by the larger size, more conical dorsal surface, narrower umbilicus, the shouldered whorls, the presence of only four rows of hairs, and the stronger sculpture.
