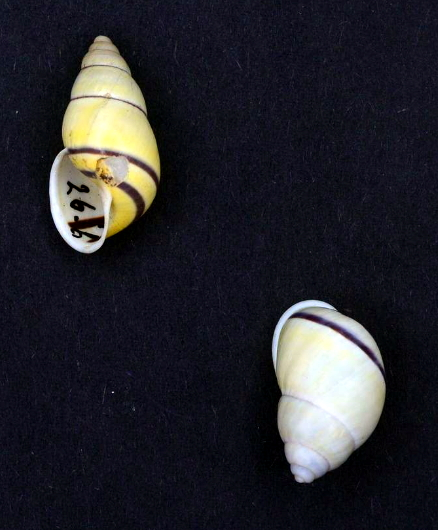
- Shell of Amphidromus sinensis (specimen at Naturalis Biodiversity Center)

Scientific classification
- Kingdom: Animalia
- Phylum: Mollusca
- Class: Gastropoda
- Order: Stylommatophora
- Family: Camaenidae
- Genus: Amphidromus
- Species: A. sinensis

Binomial name
- Amphidromus sinensis (W. H. Benson, 1851)

Synonyms
- Bulimus sinensis W. H. Benson, 1851 (original combination); Bulimus {Amphidromis) sinensis Pfeiffer, 1856

= Amphidromus sinensis =

Species of gastropod

Amphidromus sinensis is a species of air-breathing, arboreal land snails in the family Camaenidae.

Subspecies

- Amphidromus sinensis gracilis Fulton, 1896

A very narrow, solid form; pale yellow with two purple-brown bands at lower part of the body whorl; the third and fourth whorls encircled with four rows of light brown spots. The outer lip and the columella are thickened and expanded.

- Amphidromus sinensis sinensis (W. H. Benson, 1851)
- Amphidromus sinensis vicaria Fulton, 1896

Synonyms

- Amphidromus sinensis qimingi J. He & Q.-H. Zhou, 2017 accepted as Aegistohadra qimingi (J. He & Q.-H. Zhou, 2017)
- Amphidromus sinensis var. globosa Nevill, 1878 (nomen nudum)
- Amphidromus sinensis var. gracilis Fulton, 1896 accepted as Amphidromus sinensis gracilis Fulton, 1896 (superseded rank)
- Amphidromus sinensis var. indistinctus Pilsbry, 1900 accepted as Amphidromus flavus (L. Pfeiffer, 1861) (junior subjective synonym)
- Amphidromus sinensis var. vicaria Fulton, 1896 accepted as Amphidromus sinensis vicaria Fulton, 1896 (basionym)

== Distribution ==
This species occurs in southern China and in Myanmar and Laos.

== Description ==
The height of the shell attains 30 mm, its diameter 18 mm.

(Original description in Latin) This smooth, perforate, sinistral shell is ovate-conical. It is yellowish, featuring two purplish-chestnut bands on the lower portion. The spire is conical with a somewhat blunt apex. It comprises 5.5 slightly convex whorls, with the body whorl extending along the spire's axis. Submedian and basal bands continue into the aperture. The columella is slightly twisted. The aperture is oblique, obliquely ovate, and the peristome is flattened-reflexed, livid purple, becoming livid brown posteriorly. The margins are barely connected by a whitish callus. The columella is whitish, with a short dilation at the upper end.
