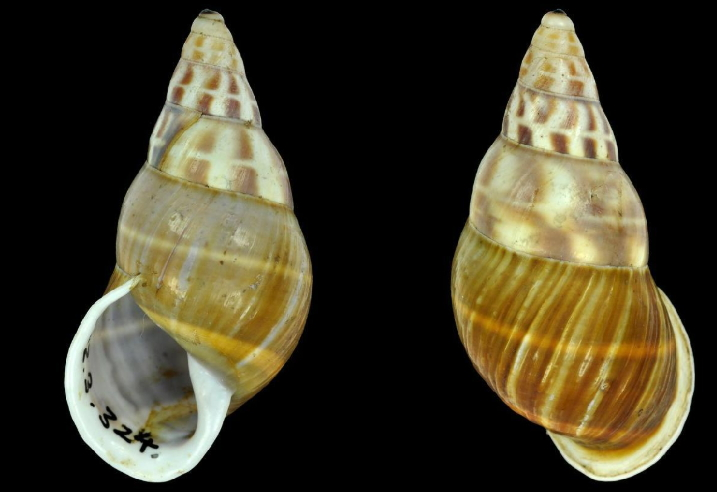
- Shell of Amphidromus crassus (lectotype at the Natural History Museum, London)

Scientific classification
- Kingdom: Animalia
- Phylum: Mollusca
- Class: Gastropoda
- Order: Stylommatophora
- Family: Camaenidae
- Genus: Amphidromus
- Species: A. crassus

Binomial name
- Amphidromus crassus Fulton, 1899

Synonyms
- Amphidromus (Syndromus) contrarius crassa Fulton, 1899 alternative representation; Amphidromus contrarius crassa Fulton, 1899; Amphidromus contrarius var. crassa Fulton, 1899

= Amphidromus crassus =

Species of tree snail

Amphidromus crassus is a species of air-breathing tree snail, an arboreal gastropod mollusk in the family Camaenidae.

== Description ==
The length of this sinister shell attains 40.4 mm, its diameter 19.4 mm

(Original description) This is similar in shape to the typical form of Amphidromus contrarius (O.F. Müller, 1774), but is a much more solid shell. The columella is thick and round, not thin and expanded as in the type. Whilst the aperture is somewhat higher in proportion to the height of the shell, and the interrupted oblique colour- stripes of the type are absent on the body whorl of this species.

== Distribution ==
This species is endemic to Timor Island.
