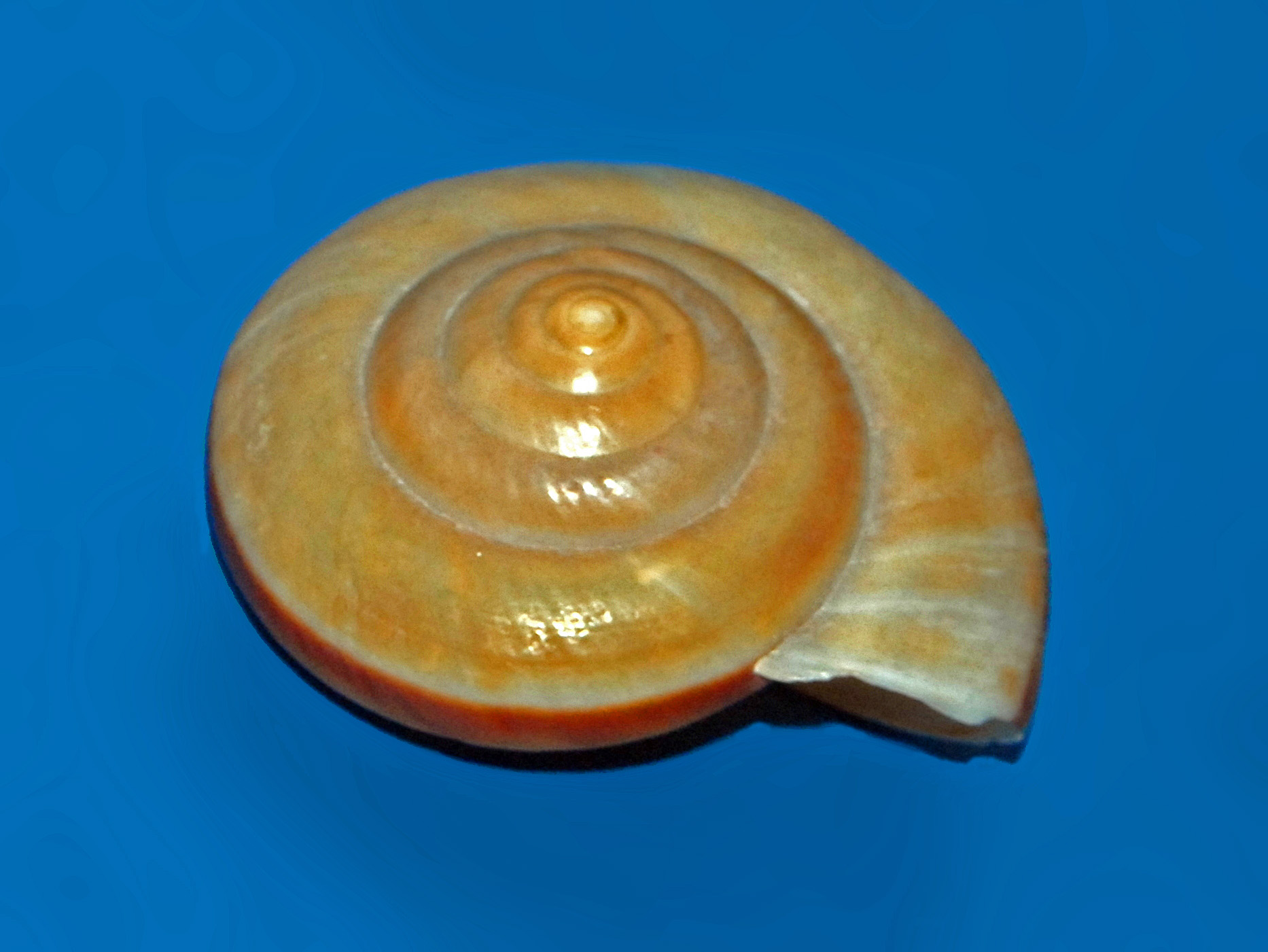
- Shell of Hemiplecta humpreysiana from Borneo at the Museo Civico di Storia Naturale di Milano

Scientific classification
- Kingdom: Animalia
- Phylum: Mollusca
- Class: Gastropoda
- Order: Stylommatophora
- Infraorder: Limacoidei
- Superfamily: Helicarionoidea
- Family: Ariophantidae
- Genus: Hemiplecta; Albers, 1850

Type species
- Helix humphreysiana I. Lea, 1840

Synonyms
- Ariophanta (Hemiplecta) Albers, 1850 (unaccepted rank); Nanina (Hemiplecta) Albers, 1850 (original combination); Rhysota (Hemiplecta) Albers, 1850 (superseded combination)

= Hemiplecta =

Genus of land snails

Hemiplecta is a genus of air-breathing land snails, terrestrial pulmonate gastropod mollusks in the subfamily Ariophantinae of the family Ariophantidae.

== Species ==
- Hemiplecta abbasi Maassen, 2009
- Hemiplecta ambitiosa Fulton, 1921
- Hemiplecta andaiensis (E. A. Smith, 1897)
- Hemiplecta belerang Cilia & Abbas, 2012
- Hemiplecta berschaueri Thach & Abbas, 2020
- Hemiplecta bonthainensis E. A. Smith, 1896
- Hemiplecta braammorrisi (P. Sarasin & F. Sarasin, 1899)
- Hemiplecta cartereti (E. A. Smith, 1884)
- Hemiplecta chevalieri (Souleyet, 1842)
- Hemiplecta crenocarinata Schepman, 1919
- Hemiplecta cymatium (L. Pfeiffer, 1856)
- Hemiplecta darondeaui (Souleyet, 1842)
- Hemiplecta densa (A. Adams & L. A. Reeve, 1850)
- Hemiplecta densegranosa Schepman, 1919
- Hemiplecta denserugata (Möllendorff, 1901)
- Hemiplecta divergens (Brancsik, 1895)
- Hemiplecta doriae (Tapparone Canefri, 1880)
- Hemiplecta dura (Pfeiffer, 1864)
- Hemiplecta egeria E. A. Smith, 1895
- Hemiplecta esculenta Maassen, 2006
- Hemiplecta floweri E. A. Smith, 1899
- Hemiplecta foersteri Kobelt, 1914
- Hemiplecta franzhuberi Thach, 2020
- Hemiplecta funerea (E. A. Smith, 1896)
- Hemiplecta goliath van Benthem Jutting, 1959
- Hemiplecta huberi Thach, 2017 7 (taxon inquirendum, debated synonym)
- Hemiplecta humphreysiana (I. Lea, 1841)
- Hemiplecta jensi Páll-Gergely, 2019
- Hemiplecta juvenilis B. Rensch, 1930
- Hemiplecta khamducensis (Thach & F. Huber, 2018)
- Hemiplecta khamducensis Thach & F. Huber, 2020
- Hemiplecta lanxangnica Inkhavilay & Panha, 2019
- Hemiplecta laotica (Möllendorff, 1899)
- Hemiplecta liei Thach, 2018
- Hemiplecta malaouyi (Morgan, 1885)
- Hemiplecta melleata I. Rensch & B. Rensch, 1929
- Hemiplecta mindanaensis (C. Semper, 1870)
- Hemiplecta neptunus (Pfeiffer, 1854)
- Hemiplecta nobilis (L. Pfeiffer, 1850)
- Hemiplecta obliquata (Reeve, 1854)
- Hemiplecta papuana C. R. Boettger, 1914
- Hemiplecta pharangensis (Möllendorff, 1901)
- Hemiplecta platytaenia Möllendorff, 1900
- Hemiplecta pluto (L. Pfeiffer, 1862)
- Hemiplecta recondita I. Rensch, 1930
- Hemiplecta ribbei (Dohrn, 1883)
- Hemiplecta rollei Möllendorff, 1899
- Hemiplecta rugata (Martens, 1864)
- Hemiplecta sakaya (de Morgan, 1885)
- Hemiplecta sericea Boettger, 1914
- Hemiplecta sibylla C. E. Tapparone-Canefri, 1883
- Hemiplecta simalurensis Laidlaw, 1957
- Hemiplecta soulyetiana (Pfeiffer, 1851)
- Hemiplecta strubelli Möllendorff, 1899
- Hemiplecta textrina (Benson, 1866)
- Hemiplecta totojensis (P. Sarasin & F. Sarasin, 1899)
- Hemiplecta uter (Theobald, 1859)
- Hemiplecta weberi P. & F. Sarasin, 1899
- Hemiplecta wichmanni P. & F. Sarasin, 1899
- Hemiplecta zimmayensis Godwin-Austen, 1888

Species brought into synonymy

- Hemiplecta distincta (Pfeiffer, 1851): synonym of Koratia distincta (L. Pfeiffer, 1850)
