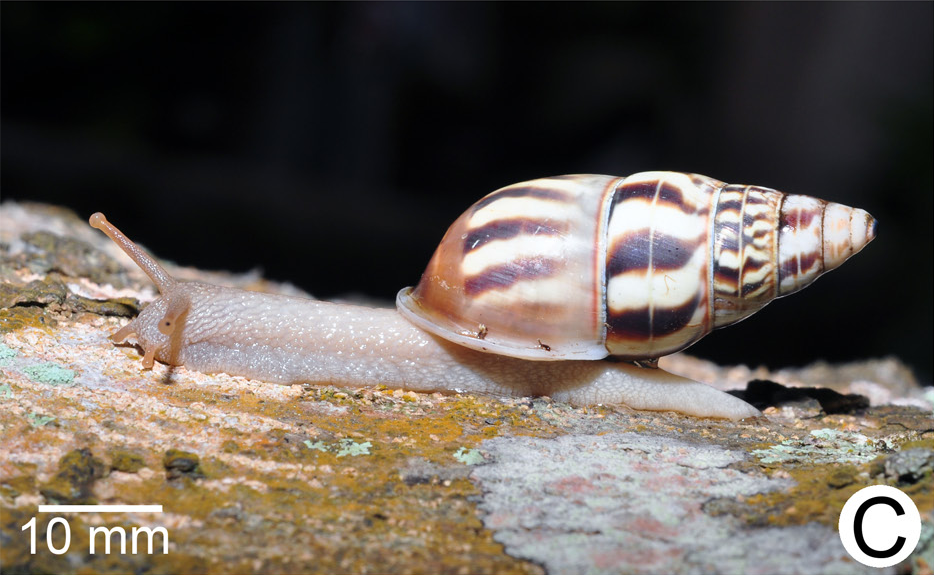
- Typical form of Amphidromus xiengensis
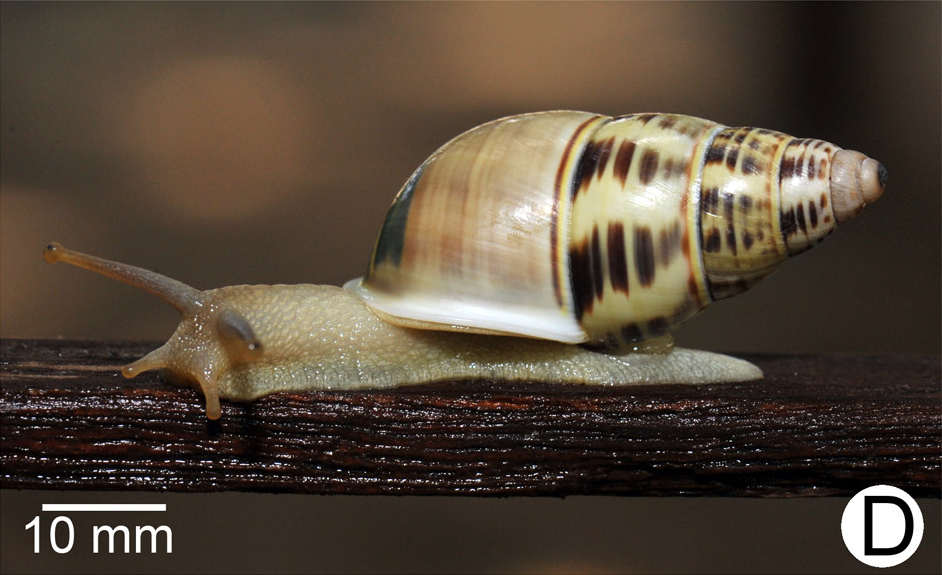
- Amphidromus xiengensis var. “multifasciata” Fulton, 1896

Scientific classification
- Kingdom: Animalia
- Phylum: Mollusca
- Class: Gastropoda
- Order: Stylommatophora
- Family: Camaenidae
- Genus: Amphidromus
- Species: A. xiengensis

Binomial name
- Amphidromus xiengensis Morlet, 1891

Synonyms
- Amphidromus (Syndromus) xiengensis Morlet, 1891 alternative representation; Amphidromus contrarius multifasciatus Fulton, 1896 junior subjective synonym; Amphidromus contrarius var. multifasciata Fulton, 1896 nomen nudum; Amphidromus xiengensis var. clausus Pilsbry, 1900 junior subjective synonym

= Amphidromus xiengensis =

Species of gastropod

Amphidromus xiengensis is a species of land snail in the family Camaenidae. It is endemic to Southeast Asia with records from Thailand, Cambodia, and Laos.

The specific name xiengensis refers to its type locality, Chiang Mai.

Variety
Amphidromus xiengensis var. tryoni Pilsbry, 1900: synonym of Amphidromus flavus (L. Pfeiffer, 1861) (junior subjective synonym)

== Description ==
The shell measures 17–36 mm (0.67–1.42 in) in height and 9–17 mm (0.35–0.67 in) in width.

The sinistral shell is narrowly perforate, elongate, conoid, subfusiform, and glossy. The growth-striae appear very fine on the upper whorls, gradually becoming more prominent on the body whorl, near the aperture. The spire is conic, with a bluish apex; comprising six and a half to seven whorls, the initial two are yellow, while the subsequent ones are ornamented on a light yellow ground with long radial brown and curved flames that are cut in the middle by a narrow yellow spiral zone. The suture is bordered by a narrow yellowish zone below which there is a series of little brown spots. The body whorl features a continuous reddish-brown sutural zone, and on its upper part, a crowded series of brown flames cut by a median yellow spiral; its lower or basal part displays three concentric zones (a yellow one between two brown ones). The aperture is suboval, somewhat angular below, and whitish inside, with the margins joined by a very thin and transparent callus. The columella is thick, rounded, and white; the outer lip appears widely reflexed and white.

== Distribution ==
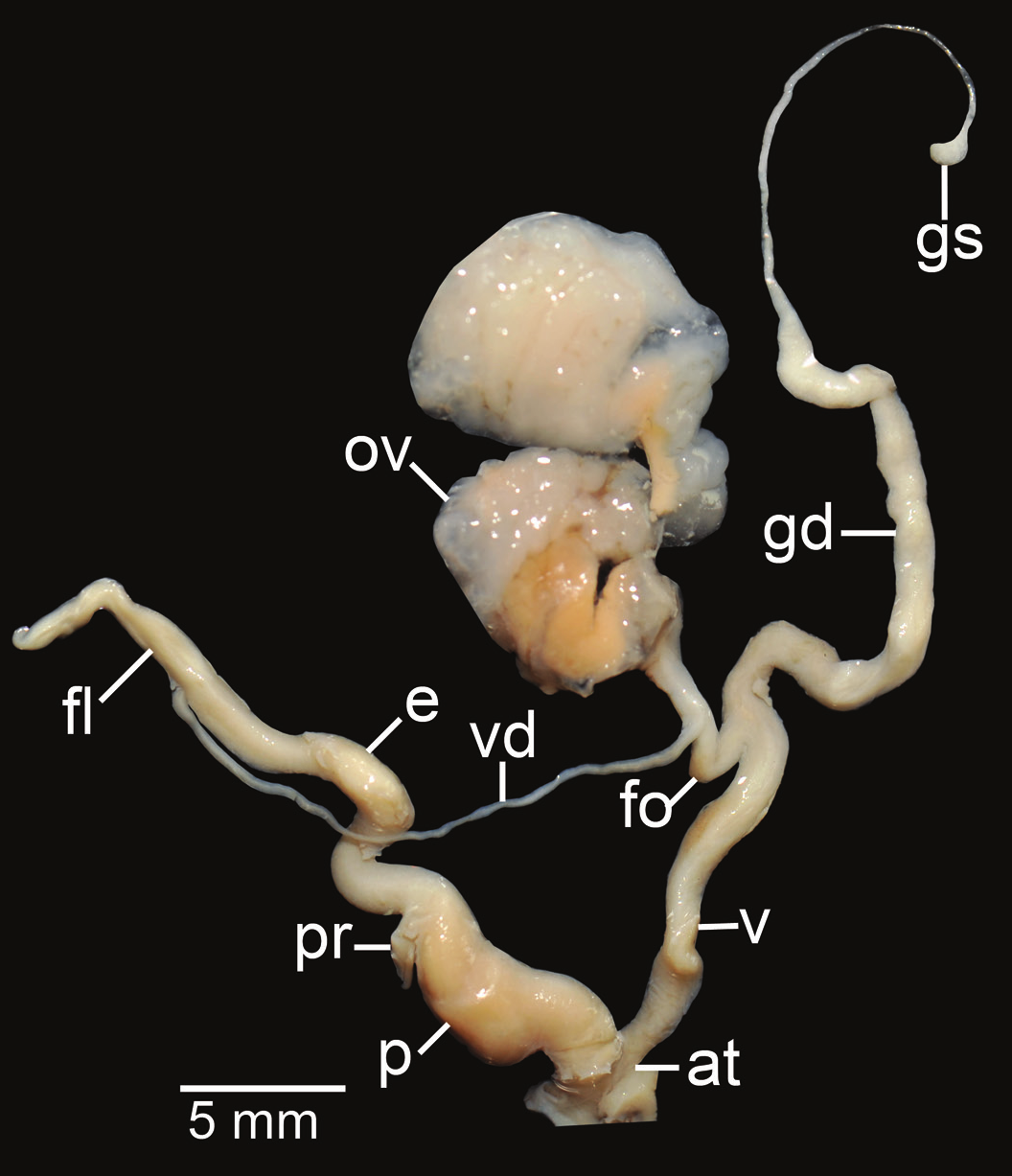
Reproductive system of Amphidromus xiengensis.

Distribution of Amphidromus xiengensis include Sakaeo Province, Chiang Mai Province and Phayao Province in Thailand, Lao Mountains in Cambodia and Champasak Province, Oudomxay Province and Luang Prabang Province in Laos.
