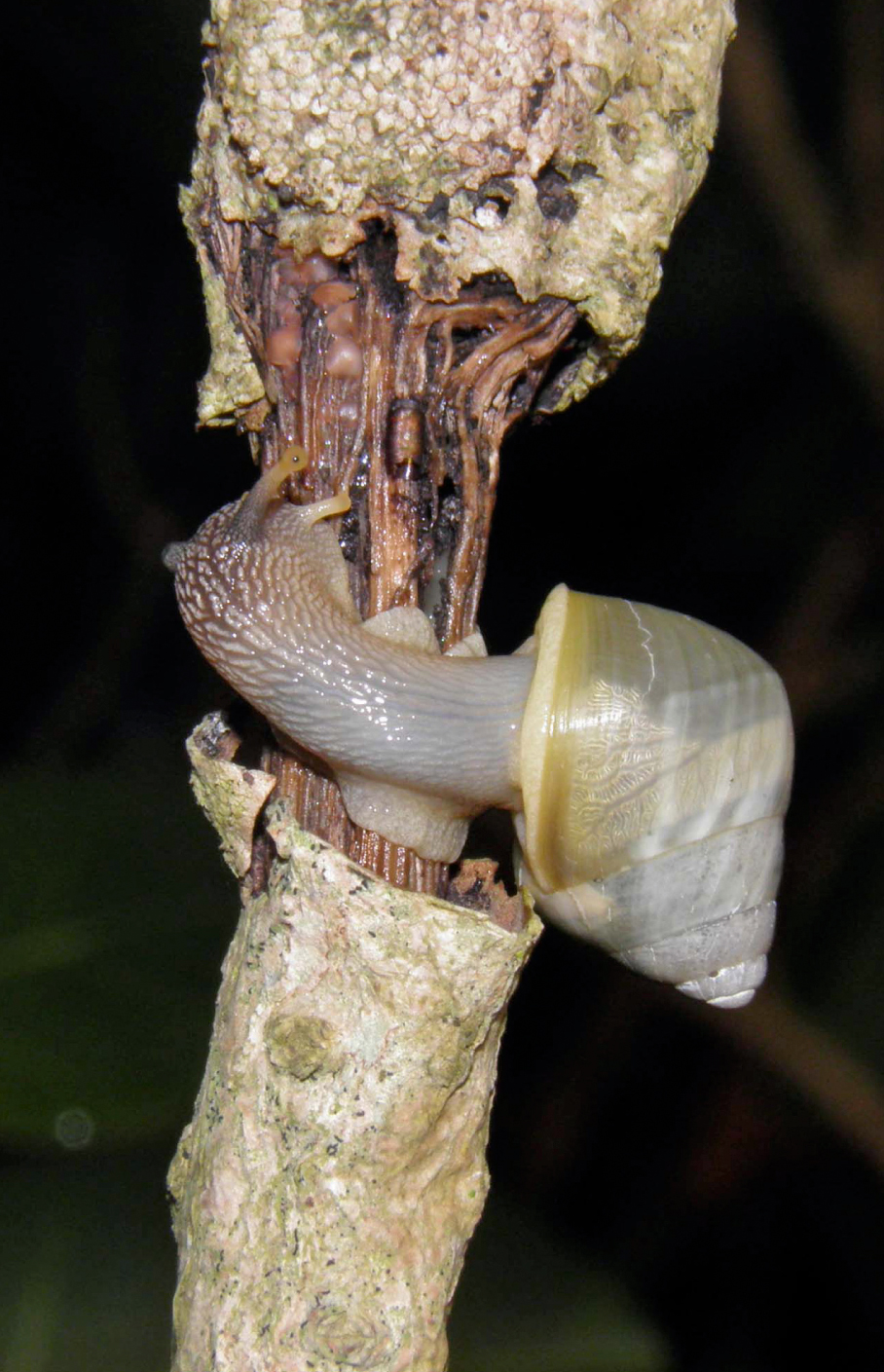
- juvenile Amphidromus inversus

Scientific classification
- Kingdom: Animalia
- Phylum: Mollusca
- Class: Gastropoda
- Order: Stylommatophora
- Family: Camaenidae
- Genus: Amphidromus
- Species: A. inversus

Binomial name
- Amphidromus inversus O. F. Müller, 1774

Synonyms
- Bulimus contusus Reeve, 1848 (junior synonym); Bulimus contusus Reeve, 1848 junior subjective synonym; Bulimus elongatus Hombron & Jacquinot, 1854 (junior synonym); Bulimus jayanus I. Lea, 1841 (junior synonym); Helix inversa O. F. Müller, 1774 (original combination)

= Amphidromus inversus =

Species of mollusc

Amphidromus inversus is a species of air-breathing land snail, a terrestrial pulmonate gastropod mollusk in the family Camaenidae.

Like most members of the subgenus Amphidromus, it is chirally dimorphic: within the same populations, both dextral (clockwise-coiled) and sinistral (anticlockwise-coiled) individuals co-exist. This is one of the very few cases of genetic antisymmetry known in nature. Among the subgenus Amphidromus, A. inversus stands out because since c. 2004, it has been the focus of studies aimed at understanding the evolution of chiral dimorphism. Most of these studies have taken place on the Malaysian island of Kapas.

== Subspecies ==
- Amphidromus inversus albulus Sutcharit & Panha, 2006
- Amphidromus inversus andamensis (L. Pfeiffer, 1871)
- Amphidromus inversus annamiticus (Crosse & P. Fischer, 1863)

(Described as Amphidromus annamiticus) The shell is dextral and imperforate, featuring a thick, slightly convexly conic spire that appears pink above, with a purple suprasutural band near the apex. Comprising seven to seven and a half whorls, the earlier two are convex, with several succeeding whorls being almost flat and slightly marginate above the sutures. The last two whorls are more convex and pale brown with some oblique chestnut streaks, the last whorl abruptly darkening to chestnut beneath. One varix may be present, or none. The aperture is white within, with the recurved edge of the peristome being dark. The parietal callus is white, gradually becoming thin and revealing the chestnut color of the base within.

- Amphidromus inversus fureyi Thach & F. Huber, 2021
- Amphidromus inversus inversus (O. F. Müller, 1774)
- Amphidromus inversus koperbergi Laidlaw & Solem, 1961

== Distribution ==
Sumatra, Peninsular Malaysia, Thailand

== Description ==
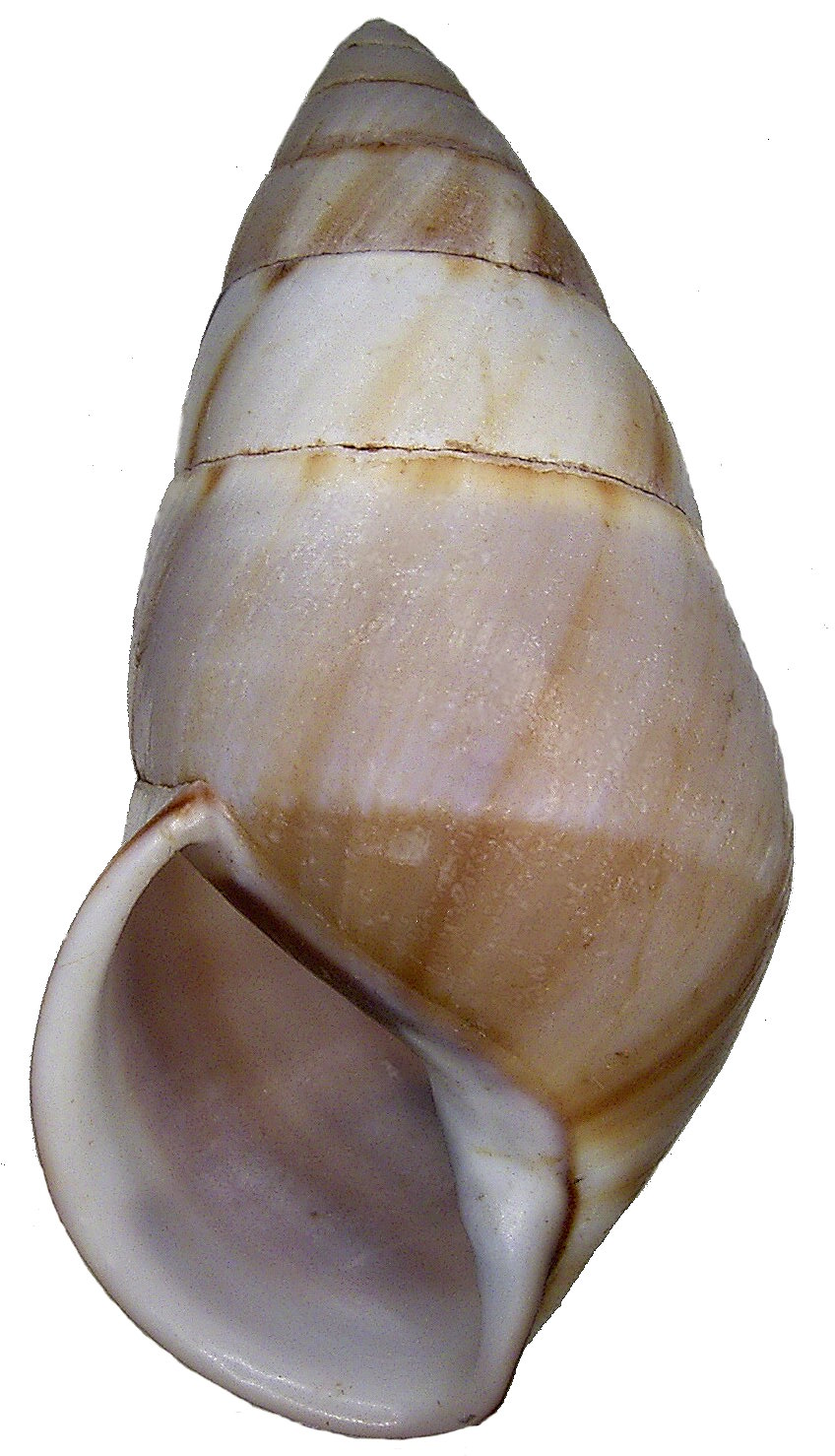
apertural view of a shell of Amphidromus inversus

(Original description of Helix inversa in Latin) This Helix possesses a conico-acuminate shell that is sinistral and whitish, displaying reddish streaks and a band, and features a reflected lip.

This is a somewhat larger Helix (land snail) and it exhibits a dextral coiling, sharing similarities in shape and size with Helix recta, but differing in color and the coiling direction of its whorls. The apex of this shell is acute. Its eight whorls coil sinistrally and are marked with reddish streaks drawn obliquely along their length; a broad pale reddish band encircles the shell near the base. The aperture is ovate and white. The outer lip appears pure white and reflected; the inner lip (labium incumbens) presents the same color, while the whorl penetrating the aperture is brown.

(Description by Reeve) The shell is oblong-ovate and rather thick, most frequently coiling sinistrally. It comprises seven convex, smooth whorls with a reflected lip. Its base color is whitish, overlaid with stains and irregularly longitudinal streaks of burnt brown. The lip appears white, while the columella and outer edge of the lip exhibit a purplish-brown hue.

== Ecology ==
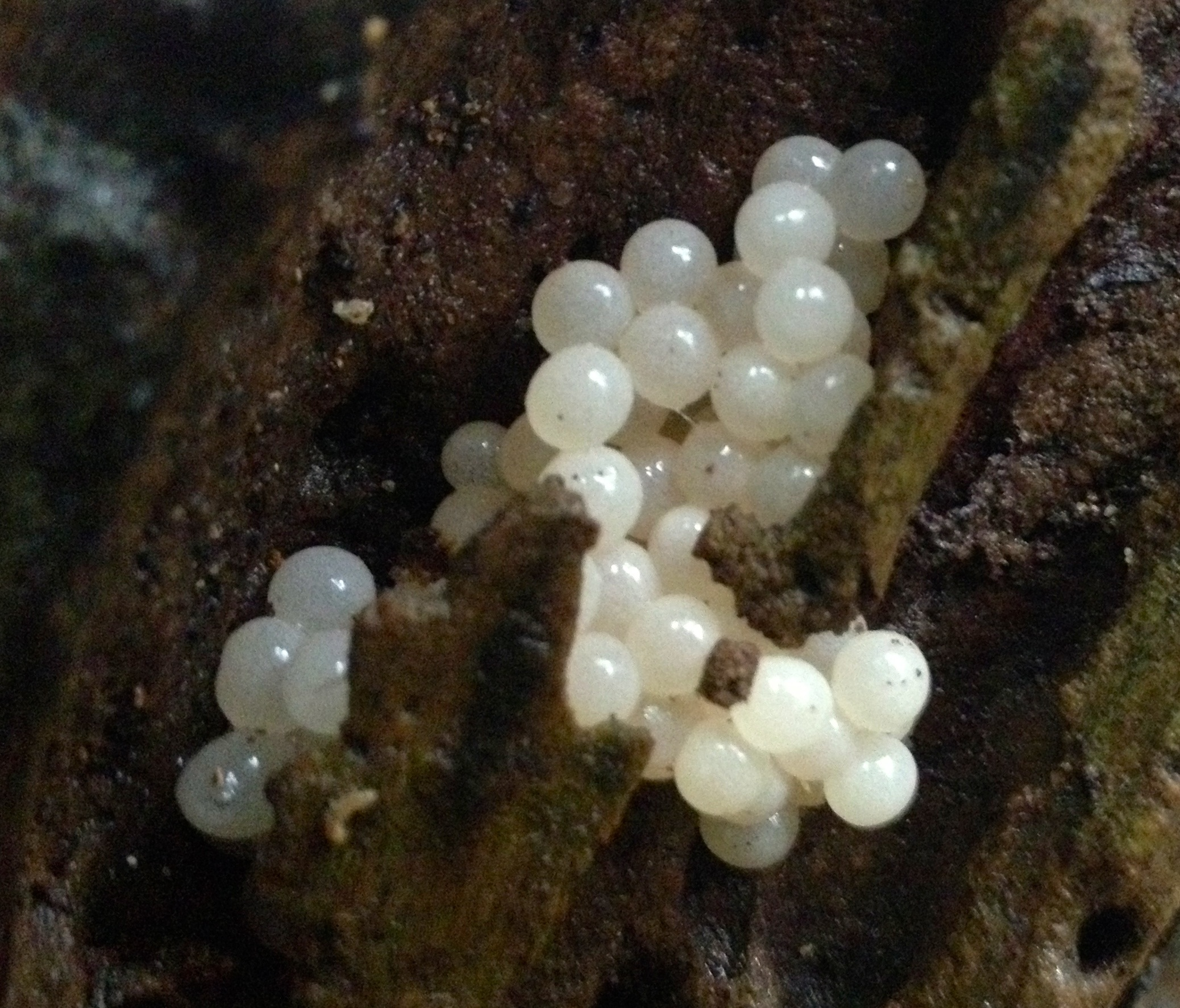
A batch of eggs of the land snail Amphidromus inversus, found in a piece of dead wood on the island of Kapas, Terengganu, Malaysia

Schilthuizen et al. (2005) described spatial structure of population of Amphidromus inversus in Malaysia.
