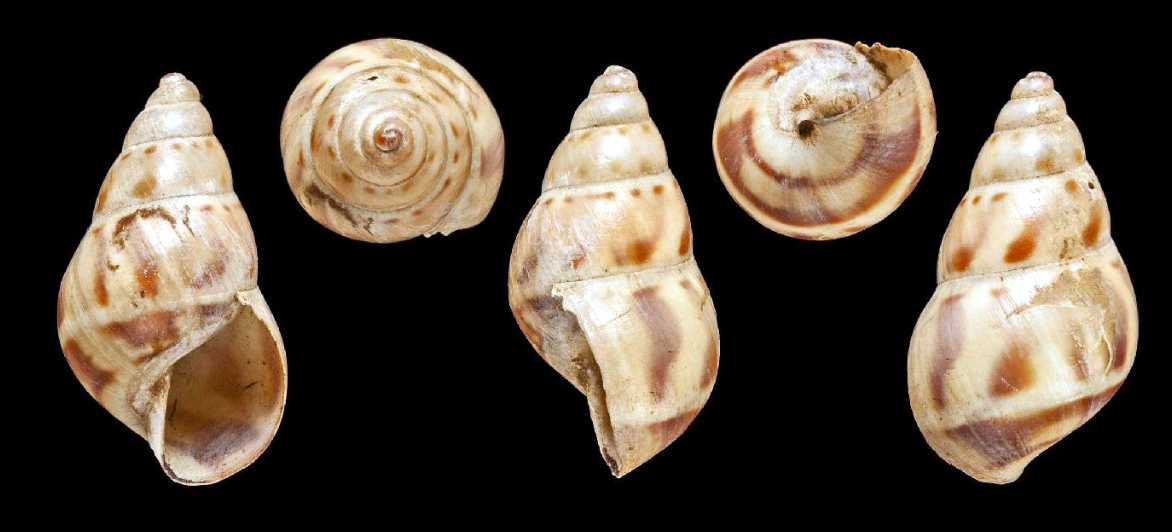
- Shell of Amphidromus moniliferus (possibly syntype at Natural History Museum, London)

Scientific classification
- Kingdom: Animalia
- Phylum: Mollusca
- Class: Gastropoda
- Order: Stylommatophora
- Family: Camaenidae
- Genus: Amphidromus
- Species: A. moniliferus

Binomial name
- Amphidromus moniliferus (Gould, 1846)

Synonyms
- Amphidromus (Syndromus) moniliferus (A. Gould, 1846) alternative representation; Amphidromus theobaldianus (W. H. Benson, 1857) junior subjective synonym; Bulimus moniliferus A. Gould, 1846 superseded combination; Bulimus (Rhachis) theobaldianus W. H. Benson, 1857 junior subjective synonym

= Amphidromus moniliferus =

Species of gastropod

Amphidromus moniliferus is a species of air-breathing, arboreal land snails in the family Camaenidae.

== Distribution ==
This species is endemic to Myanmar.

== Description ==
The height of the shell attains 30.5 mm, its diameter 17.75 mm.

(Original description in Latin) The shell is conico-oblong and typically sinistral. It is smooth and yellowish-gray with longitudinal flames. It features a linear brown sutural band and an interrupted brown subsutural band. The umbilical region is brown, divided by a yellow band. The shell comprises seven whorls, with the body whorl subcarinate. The aperture is subovate, angled, and slightly effuse at the base. The outer lip is reflexed, reddish-purple, and dilated at the columella. The aperture interior is purple.
