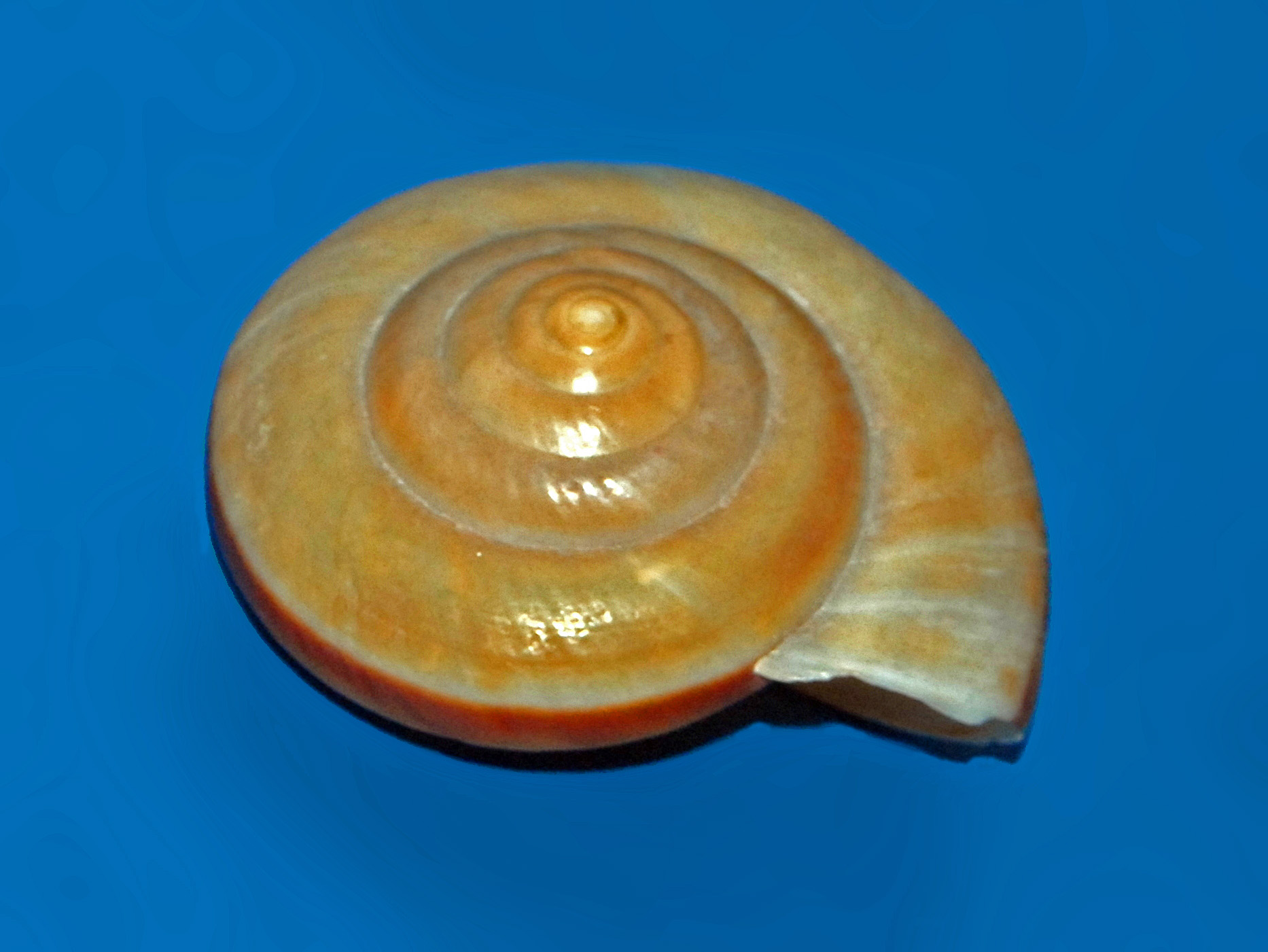
- Shell of Hemiplecta humphreysiana from Borneo at the Museo Civico di Storia Naturale di Milano

Scientific classification
- Kingdom: Animalia
- Phylum: Mollusca
- Class: Gastropoda
- Order: Stylommatophora
- Family: Ariophantidae
- Genus: Hemiplecta
- Species: H. humphreysiana

Binomial name
- Hemiplecta humphreysiana I. Lea, 1841

= Hemiplecta humphreysiana =

Species of gastropod

Hemiplecta humphreysiana is a species of air-breathing land snail, a terrestrial pulmonate gastropod mollusc in the family Ariophantidae.

== Description ==
Hemiplecta humphreysiana has a shell reaching a diameter of 33–50 mm. The surface of this shell is yellowish-fulvous or brown and minutely wrinkled.

== Distribution ==
This species is widespread in Malay Peninsula, Borneo and Sumatra.
