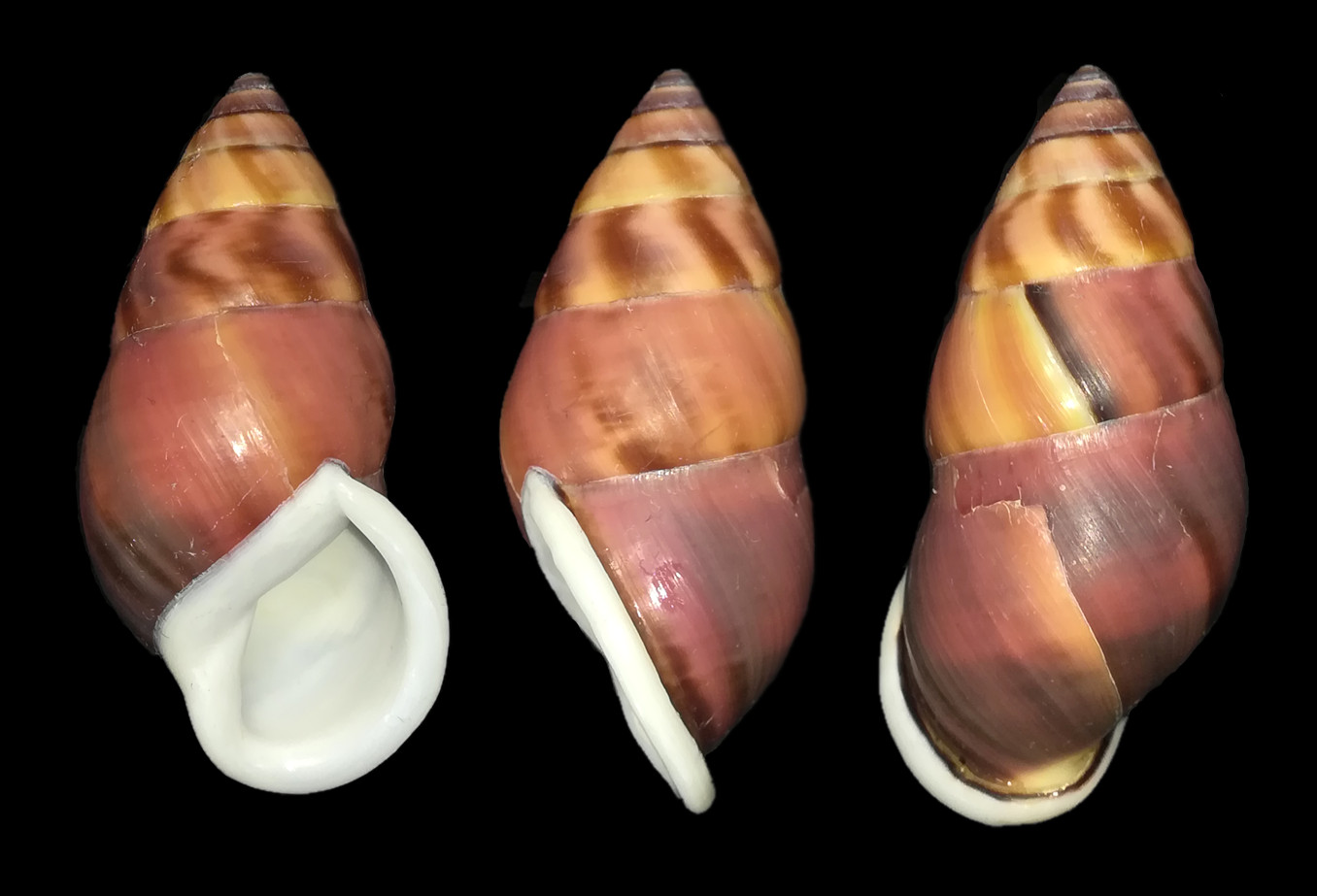

Scientific classification
- Kingdom: Animalia
- Phylum: Mollusca
- Class: Gastropoda
- Order: Stylommatophora
- Family: Camaenidae
- Genus: Amphidromus
- Species: A. comes

Binomial name
- Amphidromus comes (L. Pfeiffer, 1861)

Synonyms
- Amphidromus atricallosus vovanae Thach, 2019; Amphidromus dongaiensis Thach, 2018; Amphidromus hueae Thach & F. Huber, 2016; Amphidromus ngocngai Thach, 2017; Amphidromus vietnamensis Thach & F. Huber, 2017; Bulimus comes L. Pfeiffer, 1861; Cochlostyla polymorpha Tapparone Canefri, 1874 (original combination)

= Amphidromus comes =

Species of snail

Amphidromus comes is a species of air-breathing land snail, a terrestrial pulmonate gastropod mollusc in the family Camaenidae.

== Description ==
The length of the shell attains 46.7 mm, its diameter 28.1 mm.

(Original description in Latin) The imperforate shell is conico-oblong, rather thick and longitudinally very finely striated. It is glossy, pale lemon-yellow variegated with brownish streaks or flames above and greenish streaks below, often confluent.

The spire is conical with a single varix. The pale apex is somewhat blunt. The suture is submarginate. The shell contains 7 whorls. These are somewhat convex, the body whorl nearly equaling the spire. They are faintly and obliquely streaked with green flames. The aperture is white internally and is axe-shaped. The columella is somewhat vertical. The peristome is thickened, moderately expanded, white, with a thick white parietal callus.

== Habitat ==
This species lives in trees.

== Distribution ==
The type locality of this species is Singapore.
