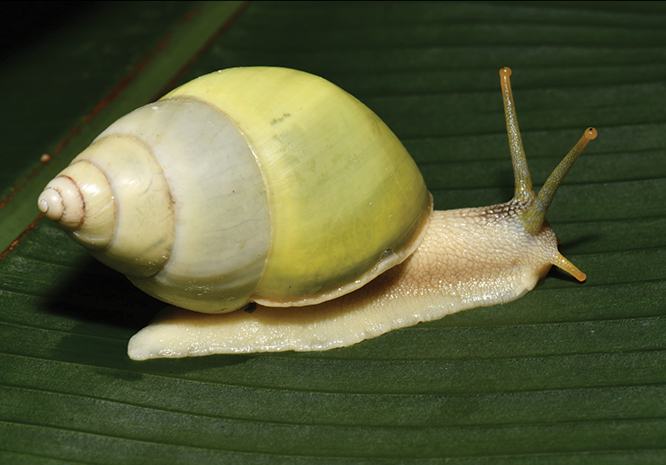
- Live specimen of Amphidromus leucoxanthus

Scientific classification
- Kingdom: Animalia
- Phylum: Mollusca
- Class: Gastropoda
- Order: Stylommatophora
- Family: Camaenidae
- Genus: Amphidromus
- Species: A. leucoxanthus

Binomial name
- Amphidromus leucoxanthus (E. von Martens, 1864)

Synonyms
- Amphidromus atricallosus f. laidlawi Solem, 1965 (invalid: infrasubspecific name); Amphidromus atricallosus leucoxanthus (E. von Martens, 1864) (unaccepted rank); Bulimus leucoxanthus E. von Martens, 1864 superseded combination; Bulimus leucoxanthus var. oculata E. von Martens, 1867 junior subjective synonym

= Amphidromus leucoxanthus =

Species of snail

Amphidromus leucoxanthus is a species of air-breathing land snail, a terrestrial pulmonate gastropod mollusc in the family Camaenidae.

== Description ==
The length of the shell attains 49.5 mm, its diameter 28.5 mm.

(Original description in Latin) The shell is conico-elongate, exhibiting a slightly finely striated and glossy surface. It presents a lemon-yellow coloration and is painted with a broad white sutural band. Solitary brownish-black varices mark its surface, and the apex appears white. The shell comprises seven rather convex whorls with an appressed suture. The aperture is rounded and occupies two-fifths to one-half of the shell's length, lying somewhat vertically. The peristome is thickened, white, and shortly expanded, featuring a white parietal callus. The columellar margin is straight and somewhat perpendicular.

== Distribution ==
It is found in Thailand, Vietnam and Malaysia and lives on trees bushes.
