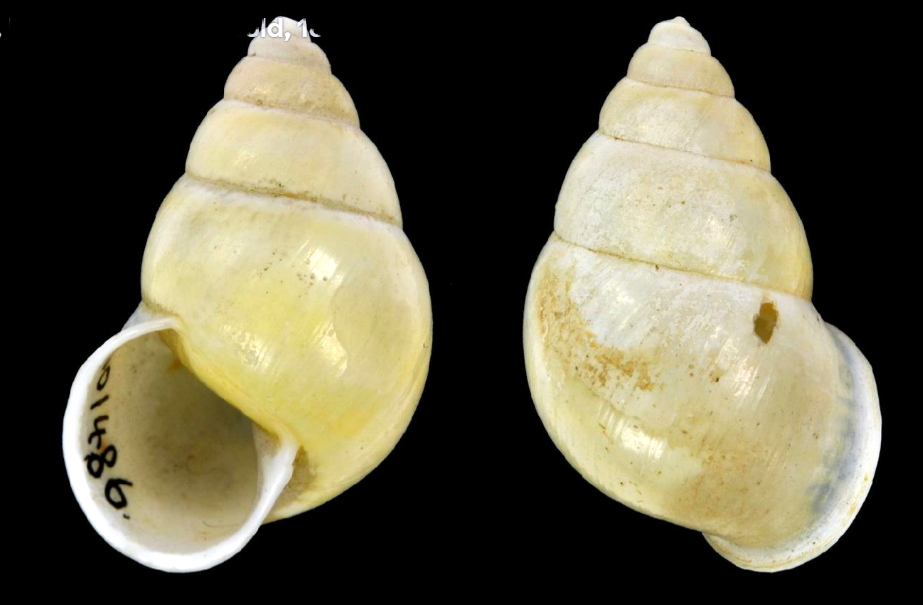
- Shell of Amphidromus lepidus (syntype at Natural History Museum, London)

Scientific classification
- Kingdom: Animalia
- Phylum: Mollusca
- Class: Gastropoda
- Order: Stylommatophora
- Family: Camaenidae
- Genus: Amphidromus
- Species: A. lepidus

Binomial name
- Amphidromus lepidus (Gould, 1856)

Synonyms
- Bulimus lepidus A. Gould, 1856 superseded combination

= Amphidromus lepidus =

Species of gastropod

Amphidromus lepidus is a species of air-breathing, arboreal land snails in the family Camaenidae.

== Distribution ==
This species is endemic to Mergui Archipelago, Myanmar.

== Description ==
The height of the shell attains 22.5 mm, its diameter 12.5 mm.

(Original description in Latin) This small shell, predominantly sinistral, is nearly imperforate, ovate-conical, elevated, and polished. It displays a lemon-yellow hue. It comprises six convex whorls, with the body whorl being ventricose. The suture is well-defined. The aperture is subcircular. The peristome is white, reflexed, and dilated at the columella, with closely positioned extremities.
