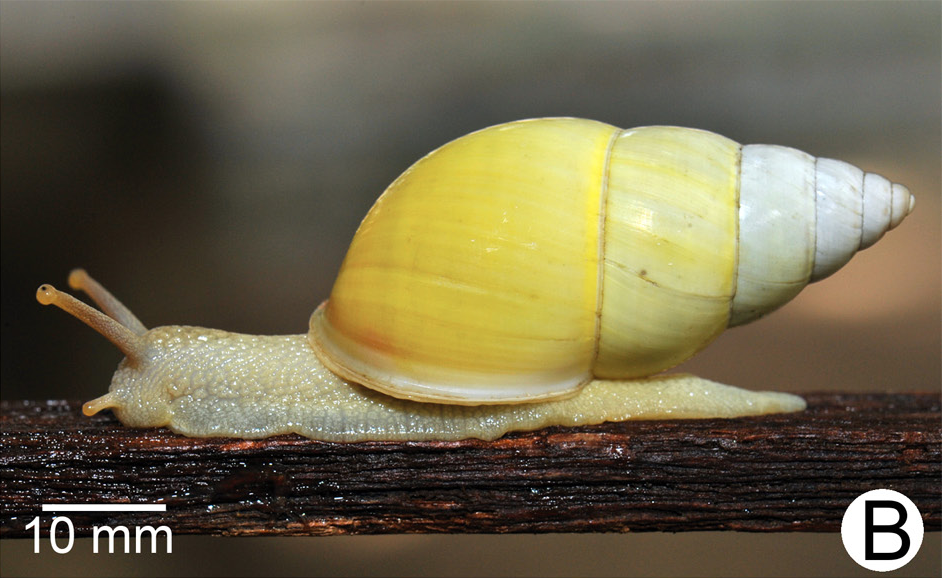
- a live Amphidromus flavus

Scientific classification
- Kingdom: Animalia
- Phylum: Mollusca
- Class: Gastropoda
- Order: Stylommatophora
- Family: Camaenidae
- Genus: Amphidromus
- Species: A. flavus

Binomial name
- Amphidromus flavus (Pfeiffer, 1861)

Synonyms
- Amphidromus (Syndromus) flavus (L. Pfeiffer, 1861)· accepted, alternate representation; Amphidromus flavus var. proxima Fulton, 1896; Amphidromus fultoniana Laidlaw, 1930 (junior synonym); Amphidromus sinensis var. indistinctus Pilsbry, 1900; Amphidromus truongkhoai Thach, 2018 (junior synonym); Amphidromus xiengensis var. tryoni Pilsbry, 1900; Bulimus flavus Pfeiffer, 1861; Syndromus flavus (L. Pfeiffer, 1861)

= Amphidromus flavus =

Species of gastropod

Amphidromus flavus is a species of air-breathing land snail, a terrestrial pulmonate gastropod mollusc in the family Camaenidae.

== Distribution ==
Distribution of Amphidromus areolatus include Vientiane Province and Luang Prabang Province in Laos, Thailand and Cambodia.

== Description ==
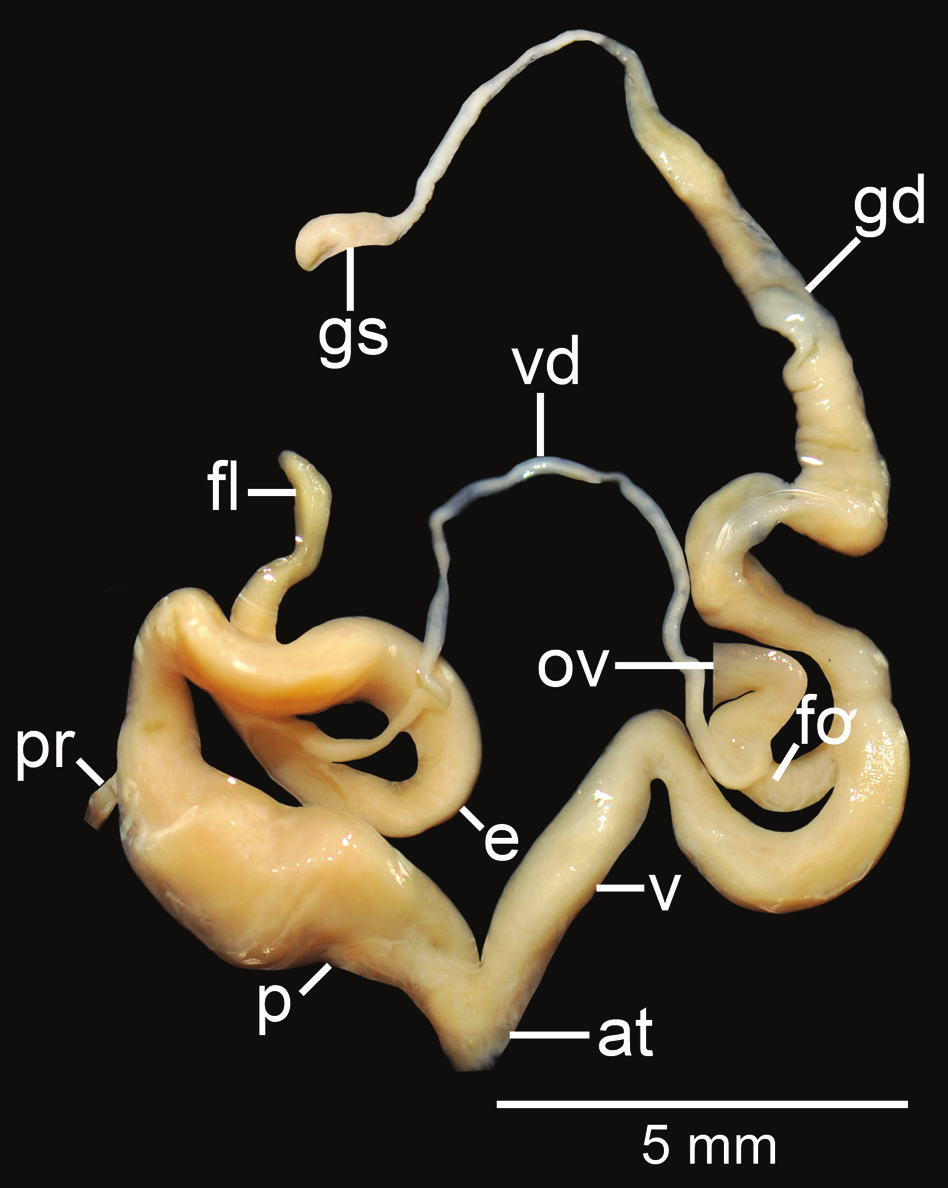
Reproductive system of Amphidromus flavus.

The shell attains a length of 30.5 mm, its diameter 16.5 mm.

(Described as Amphidromus sinensis var. indistinctus) The shell is pale yellow, featuring a subperipheral bluish band and a dusky reddish one around the columella. It appears bluish above the periphery with faint pale lines and displays a buff band below the suture. The spire is bluish, with the initial one and a half early whorls being white and sparsely punctate, and having a black apical spot. Comprising six whorls, the body whorl appears rather baggy below. The peristome is white and reflexed, while the columella is dilated and recurved, its face convex and noticeably grooved at the root. The umbilicus is quite small.
