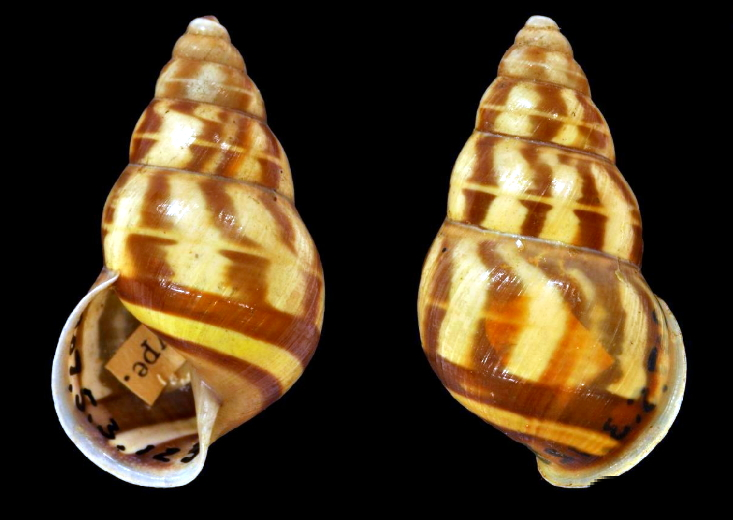
- Shell of Amphidromus niasensis (lectotype at the Natural History Museum, London)

Scientific classification
- Kingdom: Animalia
- Phylum: Mollusca
- Class: Gastropoda
- Order: Stylommatophora
- Family: Camaenidae
- Genus: Amphidromus
- Species: A. niasensis

Binomial name
- Amphidromus niasensis Fulton, 1907

= Amphidromus niasensis =

Species of gastropod

Amphidromus niasensis is a species of air-breathing tree snail, an arboreal gastropod mollusk in the family Camaenidae.

== Description ==
Amphidromus cognatus is large, with a shell length ranging from 30 mm (1.2 in) and a diameter of 17 mm (0.67 in).

(Original description) The sinistral shell is moderately thin and finely obliquely striated. The protoconch is semitransparent and waxy. The teleoconch has a light reddish base ornamented by moderately broad oblique stripes, bisected medially by a narrow spiral band of a paler hue. The base of the body whorl exhibits a moderately broad dark brown band just below the periphery and a narrower dark brown band further ventrally, separated by a yellow band. The umbilical region is reddish. The shell contains six convex whorls, increasing rather slowly. The aperture displays external markings internally. The peristome is slightly expanded and is flesh-colored. The columella is vertical, flesh-colored, rounded and slightly expanded at its insertion.

== Distribution ==
Amphidromus niasensis was found on Nias Island, off the werst coast of Sumatra.
