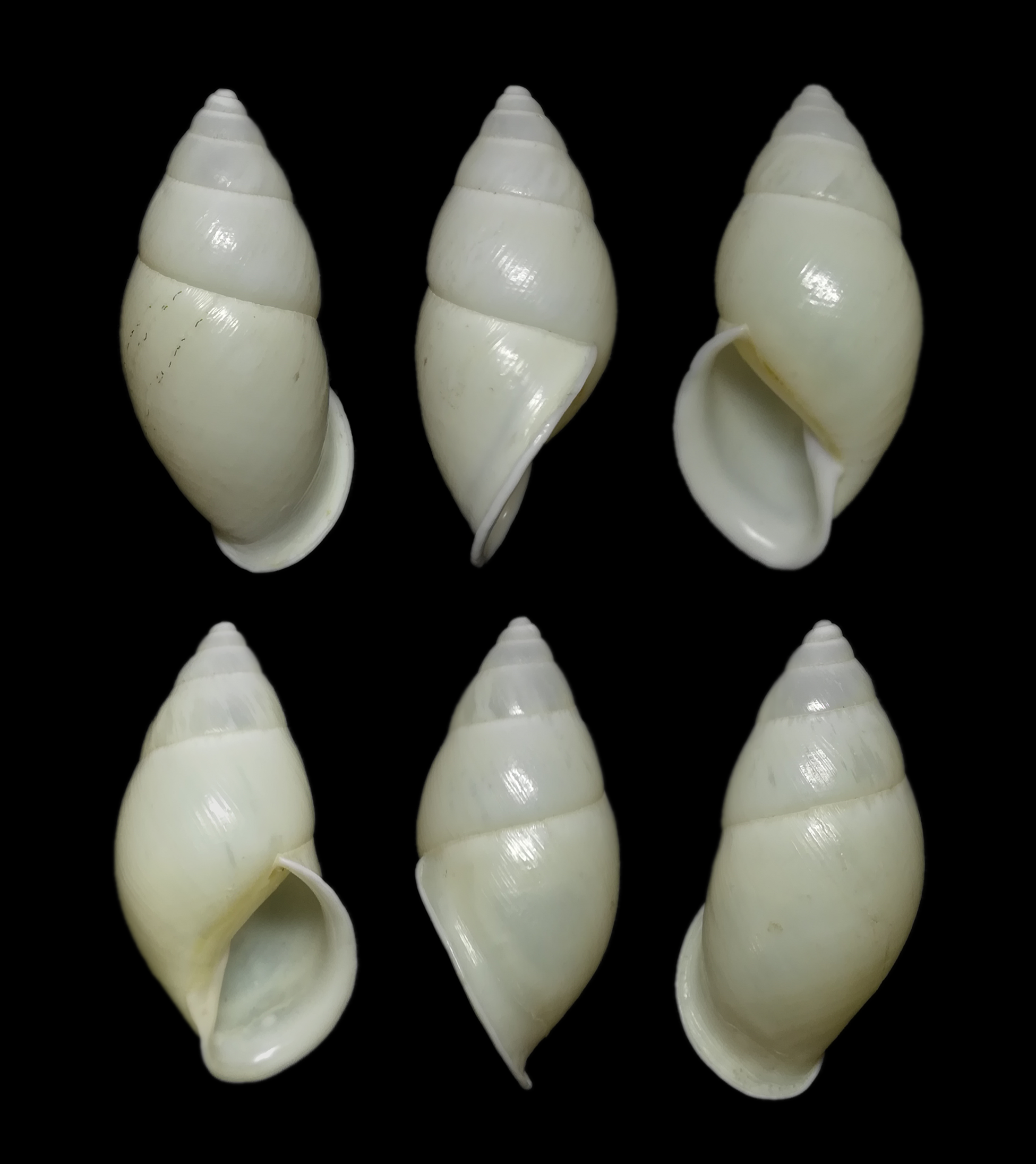

Scientific classification
- Kingdom: Animalia
- Phylum: Mollusca
- Class: Gastropoda
- Order: Stylommatophora
- Family: Camaenidae
- Genus: Amphidromus
- Species: A. sekincauensis

Binomial name
- Amphidromus sekincauensis Dharma, 2007

= Amphidromus sekincauensis =

Species of mollusc

Amphidromus sekincauensis is a species of sinistral or dextral air-breathing tree snail, an arboreal gastropod mollusc in the family Camaenidae.

== Distribution ==
Indonesia, Sumatra Island.

== Habitat ==
In trees.
