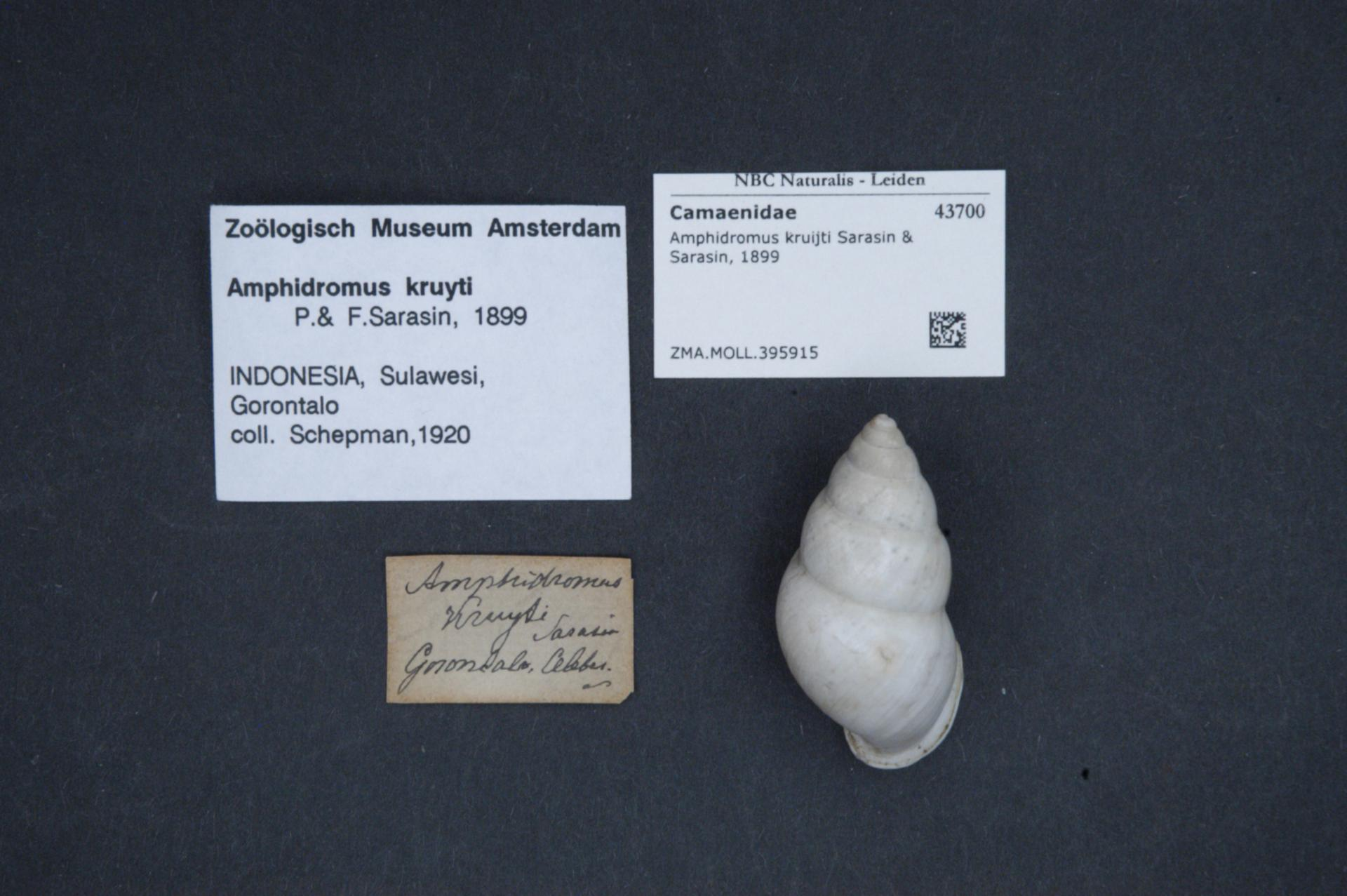
- Shell of Amphidromus kruijti (specimen at Naturalis Biodiversity Center )

Scientific classification
- Domain: Eukaryota
- Kingdom: Animalia
- Phylum: Mollusca
- Class: Gastropoda
- Order: Stylommatophora
- Family: Camaenidae
- Genus: Amphidromus
- Species: A. kruijti

Binomial name
- Amphidromus kruijti P. Sarasin & S. Sarasin, 1899

Synonyms
- Amphidromus (Syndromus) kruijti P. Sarasin & S. Sarasin, 1899 alternative representation

= Amphidromus kruijti =

Species of snail in the family Camaenidae

Amphidromus kruijti is a species of medium-sized air-breathing tree snail, an arboreal gastropod mollusk in the family Camaenidae.

== Description ==
The length of the shell attains 53.5 mm, its diameter 21 mm.

(Original description in German) This is a large species from northern Sulawesi and the northern part of Central Sulawesi, easily recognizable by the shortness of its body whorl, the open umbilicus, the convex whorls, and the broadly reflected, thin outer lip.

The large, thick-shelled shell is always sinistrally (left) coiled, slenderly drawn out in a conical shape, with a rounded, half-covered umbilicus. It contains 7½ convex whorls, separated by deep sutures, sometimes somewhat angled towards the suture, with a narrow band pressed against it, the body whorl is relatively short. The aperture occupies less than half the shell length. It is vertical, elongated oval, its lip thin but broadly reflected, like the opening of a trumpet, white, connected internally by a thin callus; the basal lip forming an angle with the columellar lip, the latter broadly triangularly attached upwards.

The sculpture consists of growth lines, crossed by very densely packed, fine spiral lines. The color of the shell is either uniformly yellowish-white, the interior of the aperture yellow, or secondly, uniformly light greenish-yellow, with occasional translucent, dark dots (as in Amphidromus sinistralis), or thirdly, reddish-white, with darker, also reddish streaks and occasional translucent, dark spots.

== Habitat ==
This species lives in trees.

== Distribution ==
The type locality of this species is Sulawesi, Indonesia.
