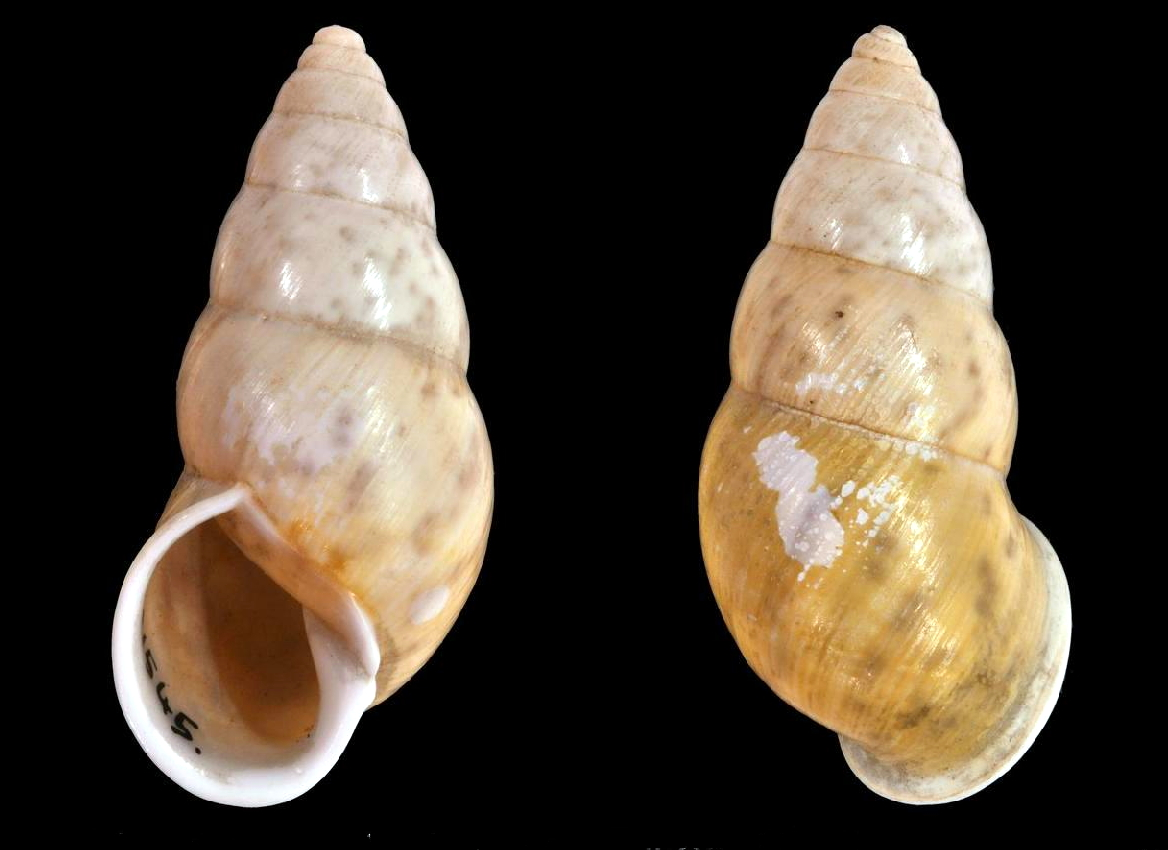
- A shell of Amphidromus sinistralis roseus (lectotype at Natural History Museum, London)

Scientific classification
- Kingdom: Animalia
- Phylum: Mollusca
- Class: Gastropoda
- Order: Stylommatophora
- Family: Camaenidae
- Genus: Amphidromus
- Species: A. sinistralis

Binomial name
- Amphidromus sinistralis (Reeve, 1849)

Synonyms
- Amphidromus (Syndromus) sinistralis (Reeve, 1849) alternative representation; Bulimus sinistralis Reeve, 1849 superseded combination

= Amphidromus sinistralis =

Species of gastropod

Amphidromus sinistralis, common name the sinistral bulimus, is a species of air-breathing land snail, a terrestrial pulmonate gastropod mollusc in the family Camaenidae.

Subspecies

- Amphidromus sinistralis luteus (E. von Martens, 1867)
- Amphidromus sinistralis roseus Fulton, 1896
- Amphidromus sinistralis sinistralis (Reeve, 1849)

== Description ==
The length of the shell attains 37.3 mm, its diameter 18.5 mm.

(Original description) The shell is somewhat acuminately oblong and rather thick, exhibiting a sinistral coiling and being scarcely umbilicated. It comprises seven whorls that appear somewhat rounded and obliquely striated. The columella is reflected, and the aperture is rather small with a reflected outer lip. The shell displays a yellow base color marbled with olive-green, while the interior of the aperture is a very dark brown, and the lip is white.

== Distribution ==
The type species was found in Java and Sulawesi, Indonesia.
