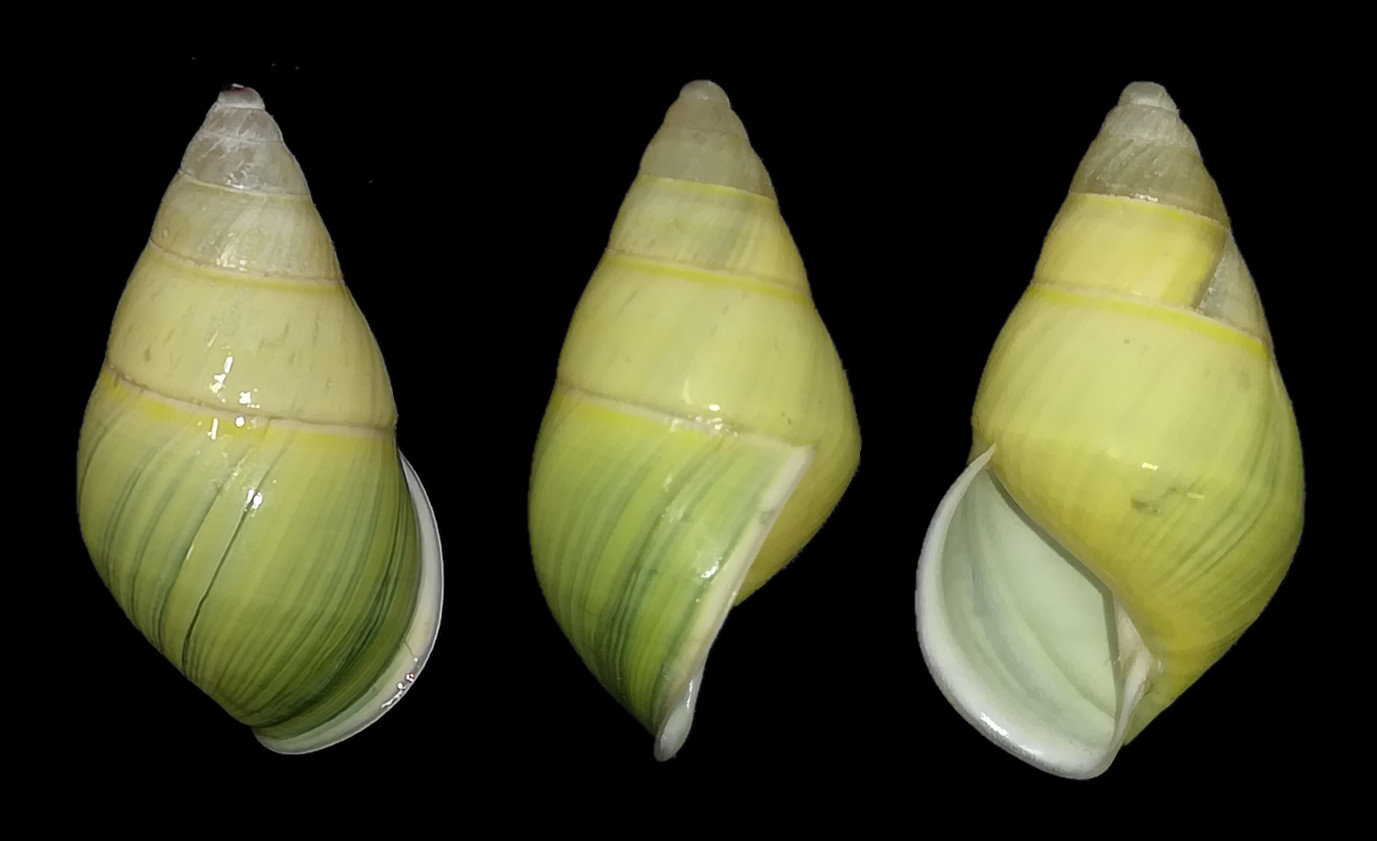

Scientific classification
- Kingdom: Animalia
- Phylum: Mollusca
- Class: Gastropoda
- Order: Stylommatophora
- Family: Camaenidae
- Genus: Amphidromus
- Species: A. mouhoti

Binomial name
- Amphidromus mouhoti Pfeiffer, 1861

Synonyms
- Amphidromus (Syndromus) setzeri Thach, 2015; Amphidromus renkeri Thach, 2018; Amphidromus setzeri Thach, 2015; Bulimus mouhoti L. Pfeiffer, 1861

= Amphidromus mouhoti =

Species of snail

Amphidromus mouhoti is a species of medium-sized air-breathing tree snail, an arboreal gastropod mollusk in the family Camaenidae.

== Description ==
The length of the shell attains 34 mm, its diameter 14 mm.

(Original description in Latin) The sinistral shell is somewhat perforate, presenting an oblong-conical shape and a thin structure. Its surface appears very finely striatulate and slightly glossy, displaying a yellow base color that is painted with close-set thread-like green streaks. The spire rises in an elongate-conical form, featuring a somewhat acute, reddish apex. The shell contains seven scarcely convex whorls. The upper ones are sometimes brown-checkered, while the body whorl almost equals two-thirds of the shell's length, appearing somewhat angled in the middle and tapering and somewhat compressed at the base. The columella is slightly thickened and twisted, exhibiting a pale lilac hue. The aperture lies obliquely and has a semi-oval form, appearing somewhat effuse at the base. The peristome is thin and expanded, displaying a lilac-pink color.

== Habitat ==
The species' habitat is mostly in trees.

== Distribution ==
The species can be found in Thailand and in parts around Đồng Nai Province, South Vietnam.
