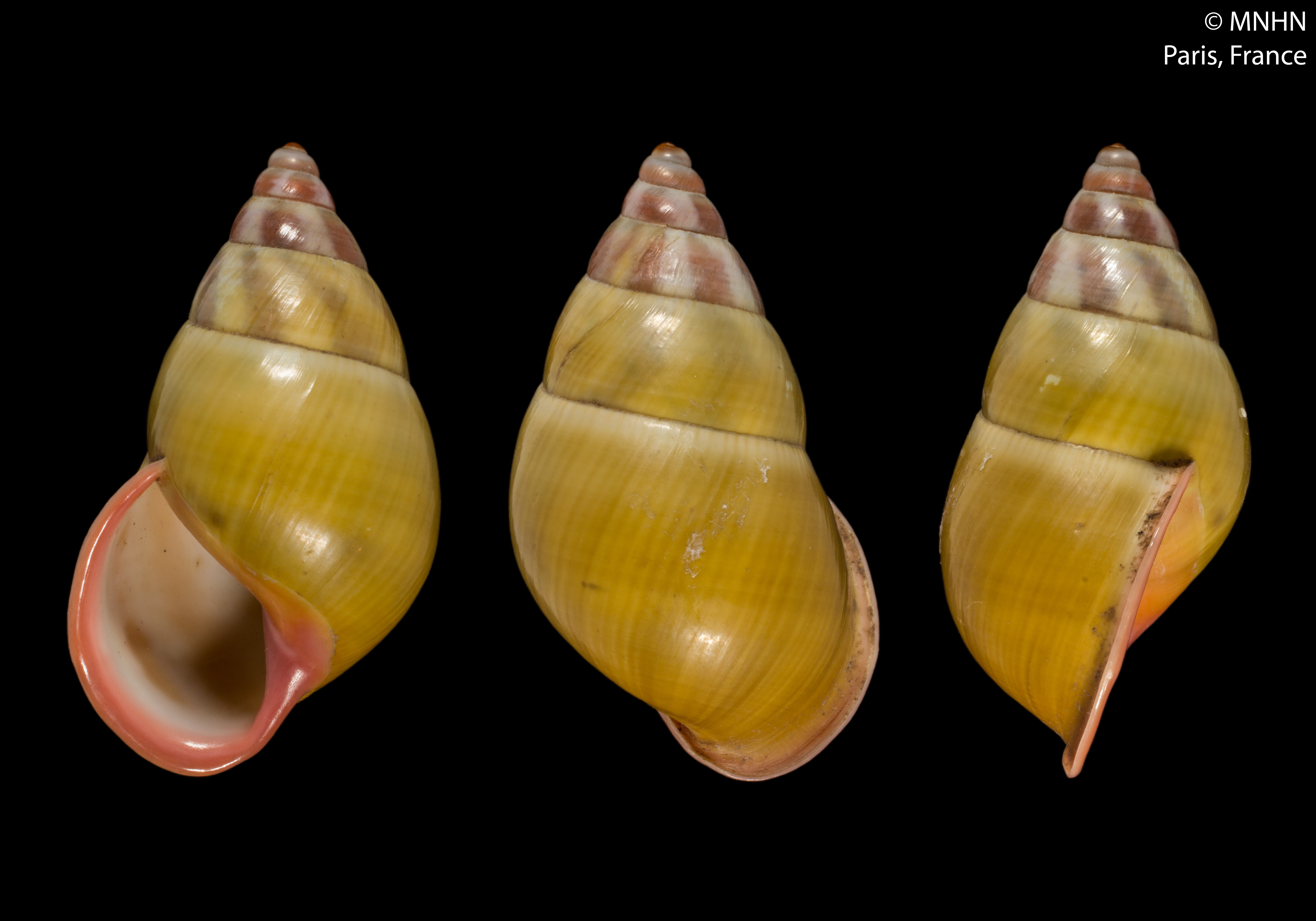
- Shell of Amphidromus yauyeejiae (holotype at MNHN, Paris)

Scientific classification
- Kingdom: Animalia
- Phylum: Mollusca
- Class: Gastropoda
- Order: Stylommatophora
- Family: Camaenidae
- Genus: Amphidromus
- Species: A. yauyeejiae

Binomial name
- Amphidromus yauyeejiae Thach & Abbas, 2017

= Amphidromus yauyeejiae =

Species of snail in the family Camaenidae

Amphidromus yauyeejiae is a species of medium-sized air-breathing tree snail, an arboreal gastropod mollusk in the family Camaenidae.

== Description ==
The shell of Amphidromus yauyeejiae is solid, dextral, and moderately large for the genus. The holotype measures 37.8 mm in height and 21.3 mm in width.

The shell is conical with a pointed apex. It consists of approximately 6 to 7 slightly convex whorls. The surface sculpture is relatively smooth with fine growth lines. The base color of the shell is typically white or pale yellow, adorned with characteristic dark brown or blackish axial streaks that are often wavy or zig-zagged. The aperture is ovate and white inside, while the peristome is thickened and reflected. The columella is straight and white.

== Habitat ==
This species is arboreal and lives in tropical forest canopies. Like many members of the genus Amphidromus, it spends its life cycle on trees, feeding on epiphytic algae and lichens.

== Distribution ==
The type locality of this species is Indonesia, specifically reported from the island of Sumbawa in the Lesser Sunda Islands. This distribution is characteristic of the high levels of endemism found within the Amphidromus species of the Indonesian archipelago.
