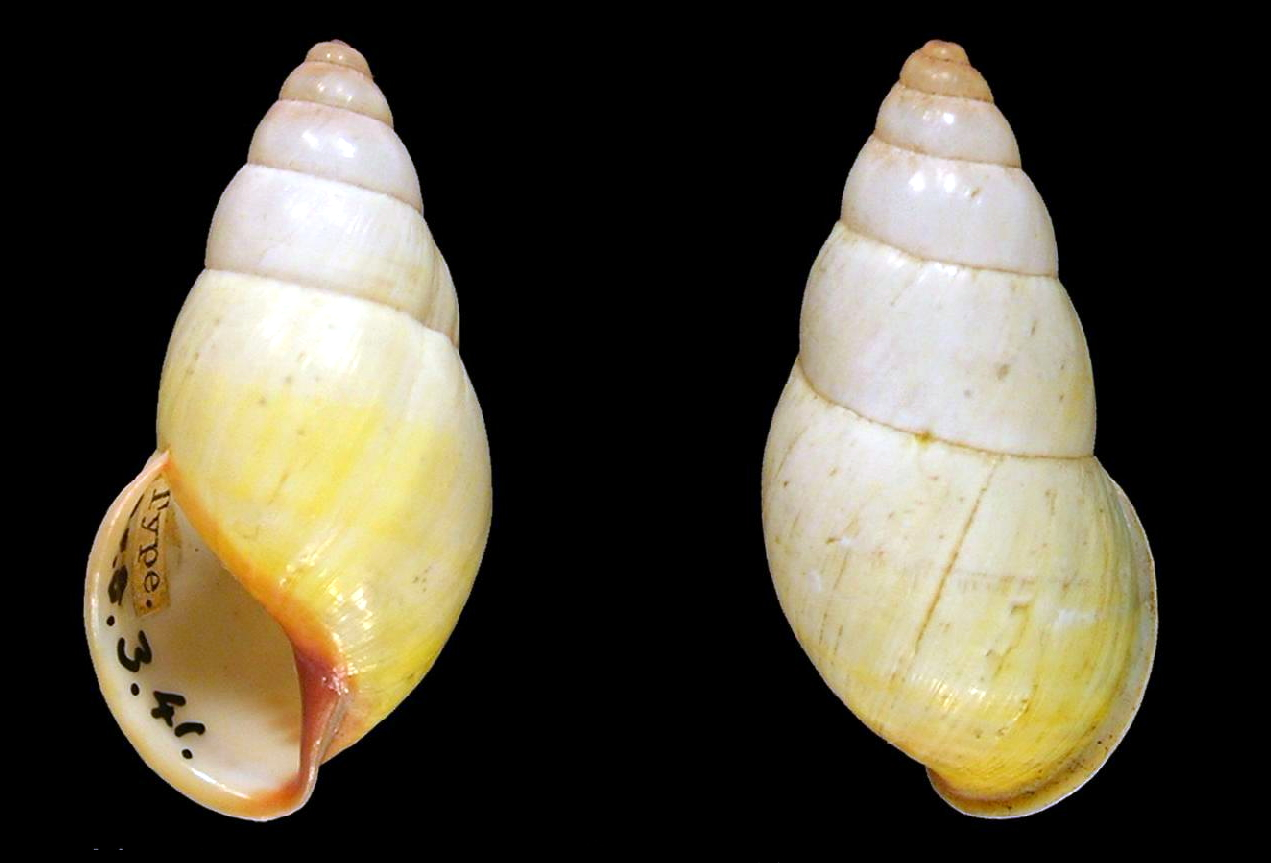
- Shell of Amphidromus consobrinus (lectotype at the Natural History Muyseum, London)

Scientific classification
- Kingdom: Animalia
- Phylum: Mollusca
- Class: Gastropoda
- Order: Stylommatophora
- Family: Camaenidae
- Genus: Amphidromus
- Species: A. consobrinus

Binomial name
- Amphidromus consobrinus Fulton, 1897

= Amphidromus consobrinus =

Species of tree snail

Amphidromus consobrinus is a species of air-breathing tree snail, an arboreal gastropod mollusk in the family Camaenidae.

== Description ==
The length of the shell attains 32 mm, its diameter 15 mm.

(Original description) The sinistral shell is oblong-conicand narrowly perforate. The shell contains six convex whorls, on the lower portion fading yellow to dull white towards the apex. The initial three whorls are semitransparent flesh-colored, tipped with dark brown. The body whorl is obsoletely keeled at the periphery, exhibiting a narrow greyish-blue band just above the umbilical region, spirally continuing onto the parietal wall. The outer lip and the columella are pale purple, connected by a thin reddish-brown callus. The outer lip is slightly expanded and reflected. The aperture interior is white.

== Distribution ==
This species is endemic to south Flores, Indonesia.
