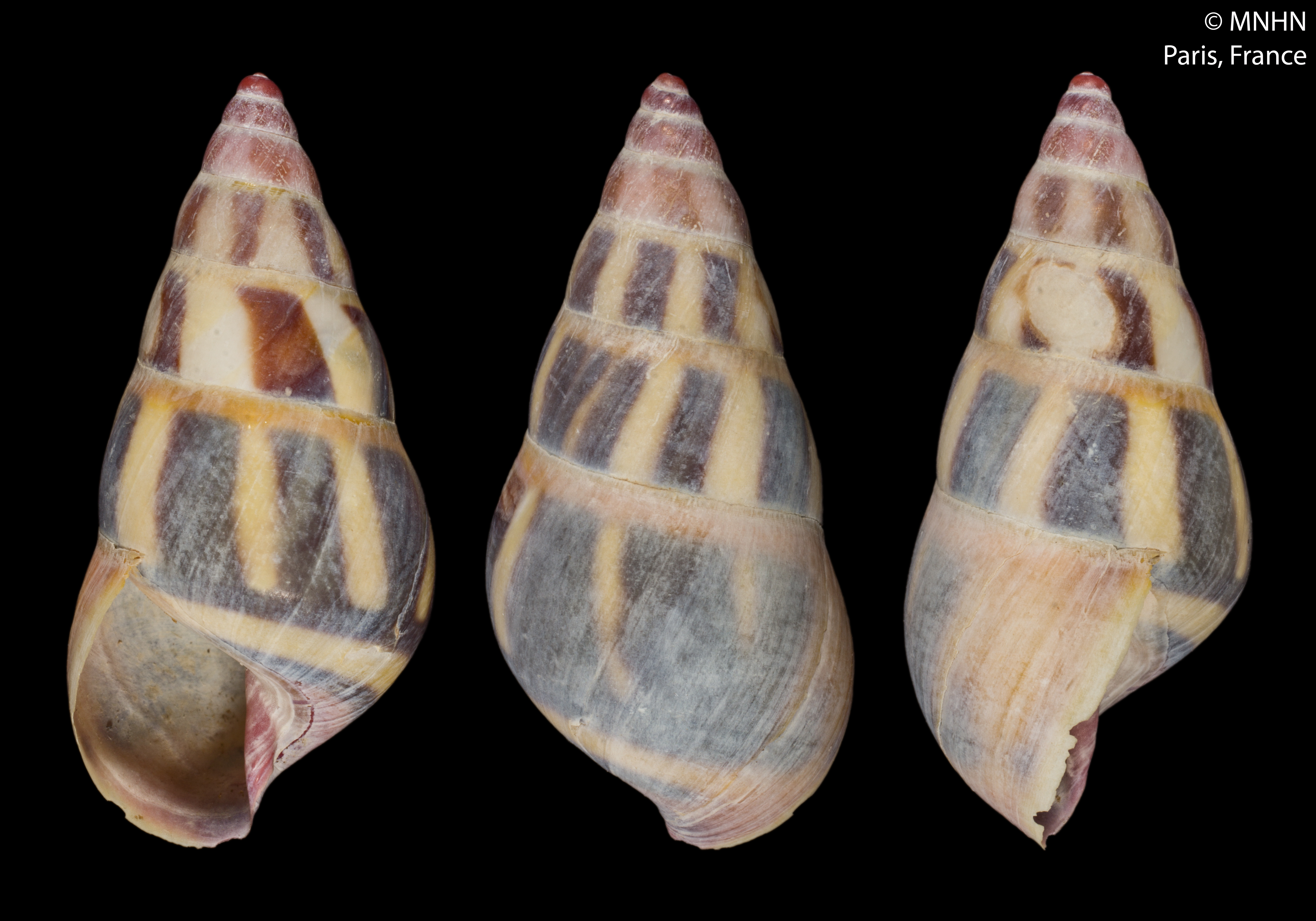
- Shell of Amphidromus yangbayensis (holotype at MNHN, Paris)

Scientific classification
- Kingdom: Animalia
- Phylum: Mollusca
- Class: Gastropoda
- Order: Stylommatophora
- Family: Camaenidae
- Genus: Amphidromus
- Species: A. yangbayensis

Binomial name
- Amphidromus yangbayensis Thach & F. Huber, 2016

= Amphidromus yangbayensis =

Species of snail in the family Camaenidae

Amphidromus yangbayensis is a species of medium-sized air-breathing tree snail, an arboreal gastropod mollusk in the family Camaenidae.

== Description ==
These snails have stripy shells that spiral to a point. The length of the shell can reach up to almost 40mm for some examples.

== Habitat ==
This species lives in trees and the habitat can be described as 'terrestrial'.

== Distribution ==
The type locality of this species is Vietnam.
