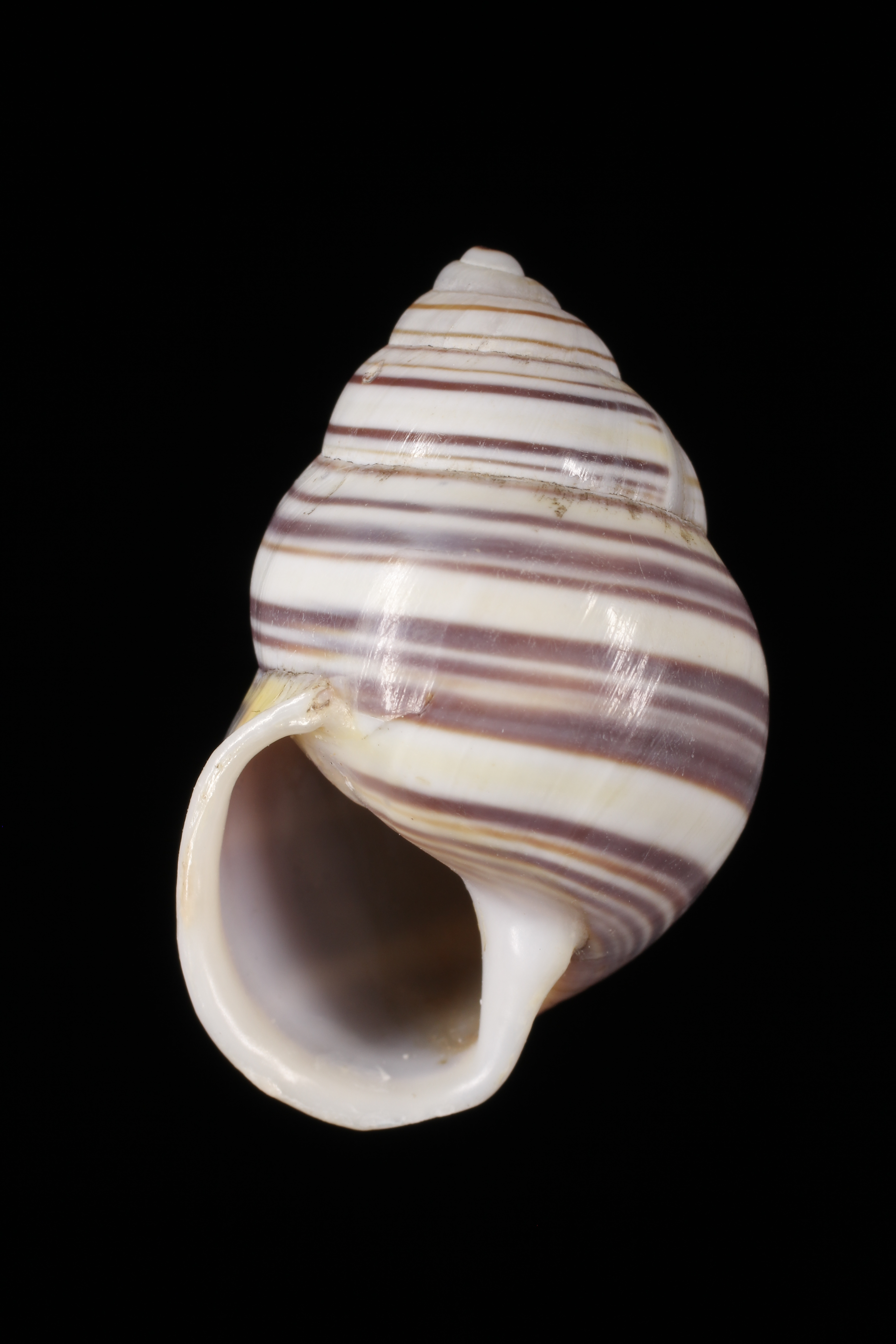
- Shell of Amphidromus vincekessneri (holotype at the MNHN, Paris)

Scientific classification
- Kingdom: Animalia
- Phylum: Mollusca
- Class: Gastropoda
- Order: Stylommatophora
- Family: Camaenidae
- Genus: Amphidromus
- Species: A. vincekessneri

Binomial name
- Amphidromus vincekessneri Thach, 2020

Synonyms
- Amphidromus vincekresneri Thach, 2020 (incorrect original spelling)

= Amphidromus vincekessneri =

Species of tree snail

Amphidromus vincekessneri is a species of air-breathing tree snail, an arboreal gastropod mollusk in the family Camaenidae.

== Description ==
The length of this sinister shell attains 30mm and has a sinistral brown pattern on its shell.

== Distribution ==
This species is endemic to East Timor.
