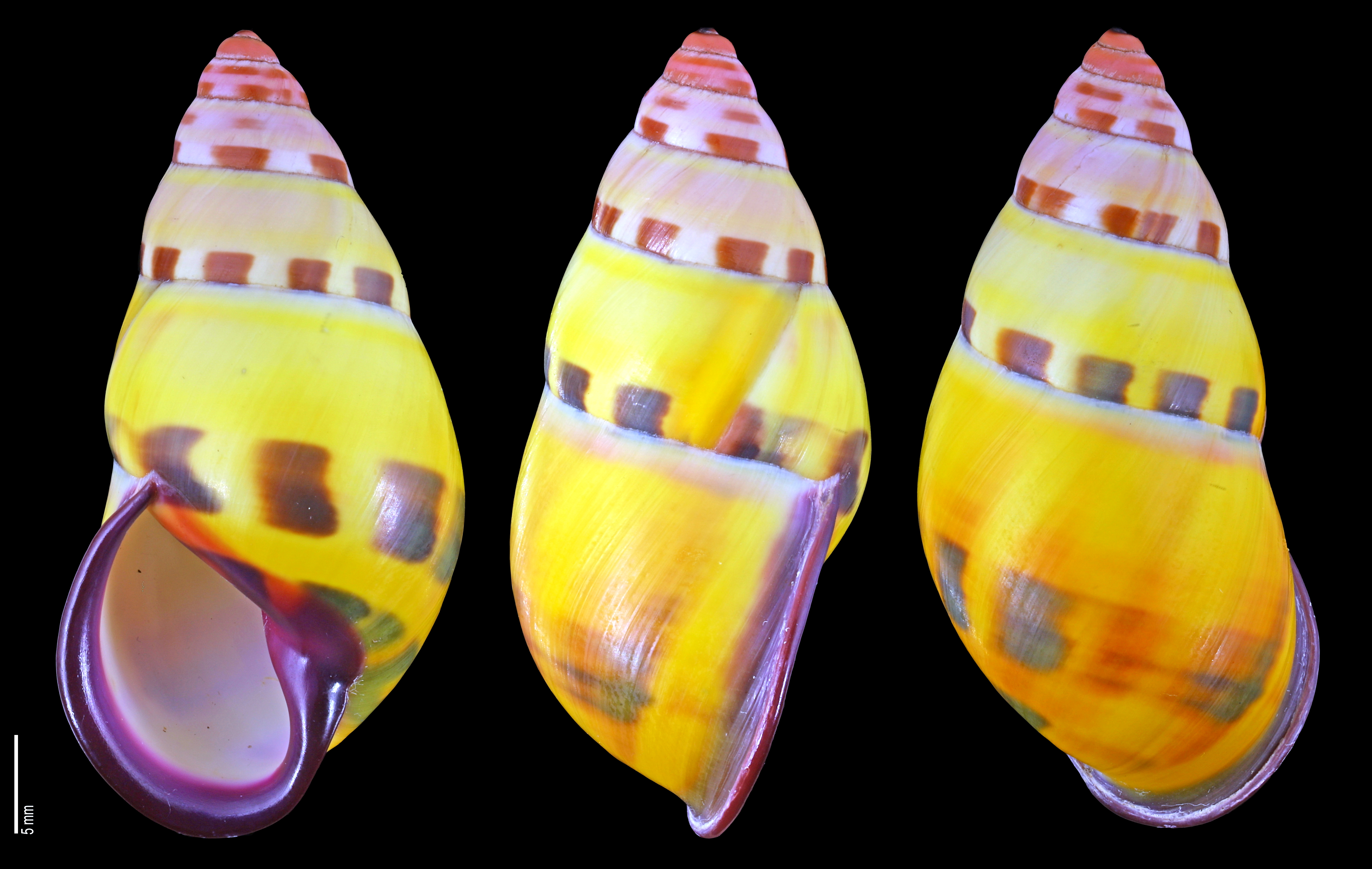
- Shell of Amphidromus tandiasae (holotype at the MNHN, Paris)

Scientific classification
- Kingdom: Animalia
- Phylum: Mollusca
- Class: Gastropoda
- Order: Stylommatophora
- Family: Camaenidae
- Genus: Amphidromus
- Species: A. tandiasae

Binomial name
- Amphidromus tandiasae Thach & Abbas, 2023

= Amphidromus tandiasae =

Species of tree snail

Amphidromus tandiasae is a species of air-breathing tree snail, an arboreal gastropod mollusk in the family Camaenidae.

== Description ==
The length of the shell attains 40 mm.

== Distribution ==
This species is endemic to Sumba Island, Indonesia.
