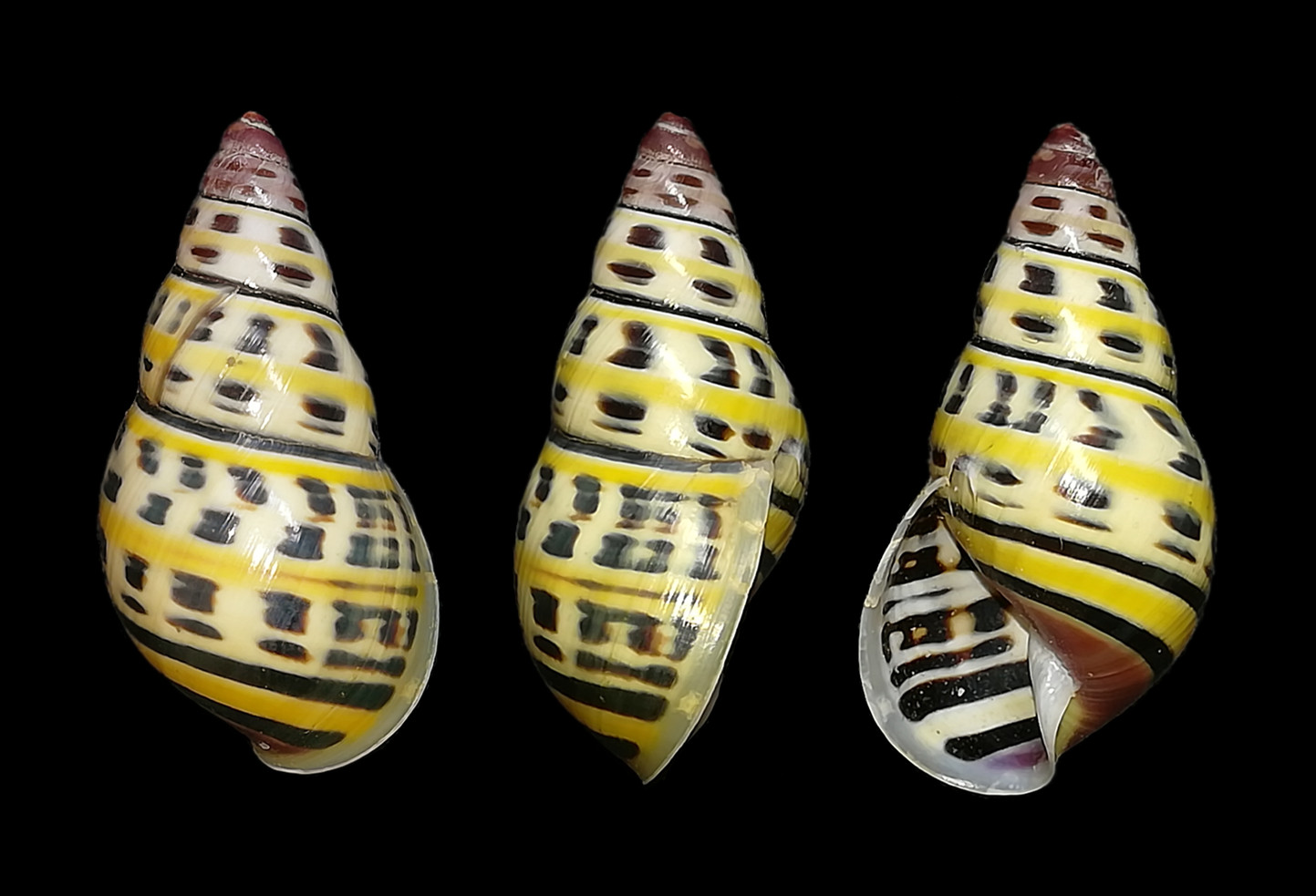

Scientific classification
- Kingdom: Animalia
- Phylum: Mollusca
- Class: Gastropoda
- Order: Stylommatophora
- Family: Camaenidae
- Genus: Amphidromus
- Species: A. bernardfamyi

Binomial name
- Amphidromus bernardfamyi Thach, 2017

= Amphidromus bernardfamyi =

Species of tree snail

Amphidromus bernardfamyi is a species of air-breathing tree snail, an arboreal gastropod mollusk of the family Camaenidae.

== Habitat ==
Amphidromus bernardfamyi is usually found in an arboreal habitat.

== Distribution ==
The distribution of Amphidromus bernardfamyi is restricted to the Sermata Islands, part of Maluku province, Indonesia.

== Etymology ==
This species is named after the Frenchman Bernard Famy, who identified the species type.
