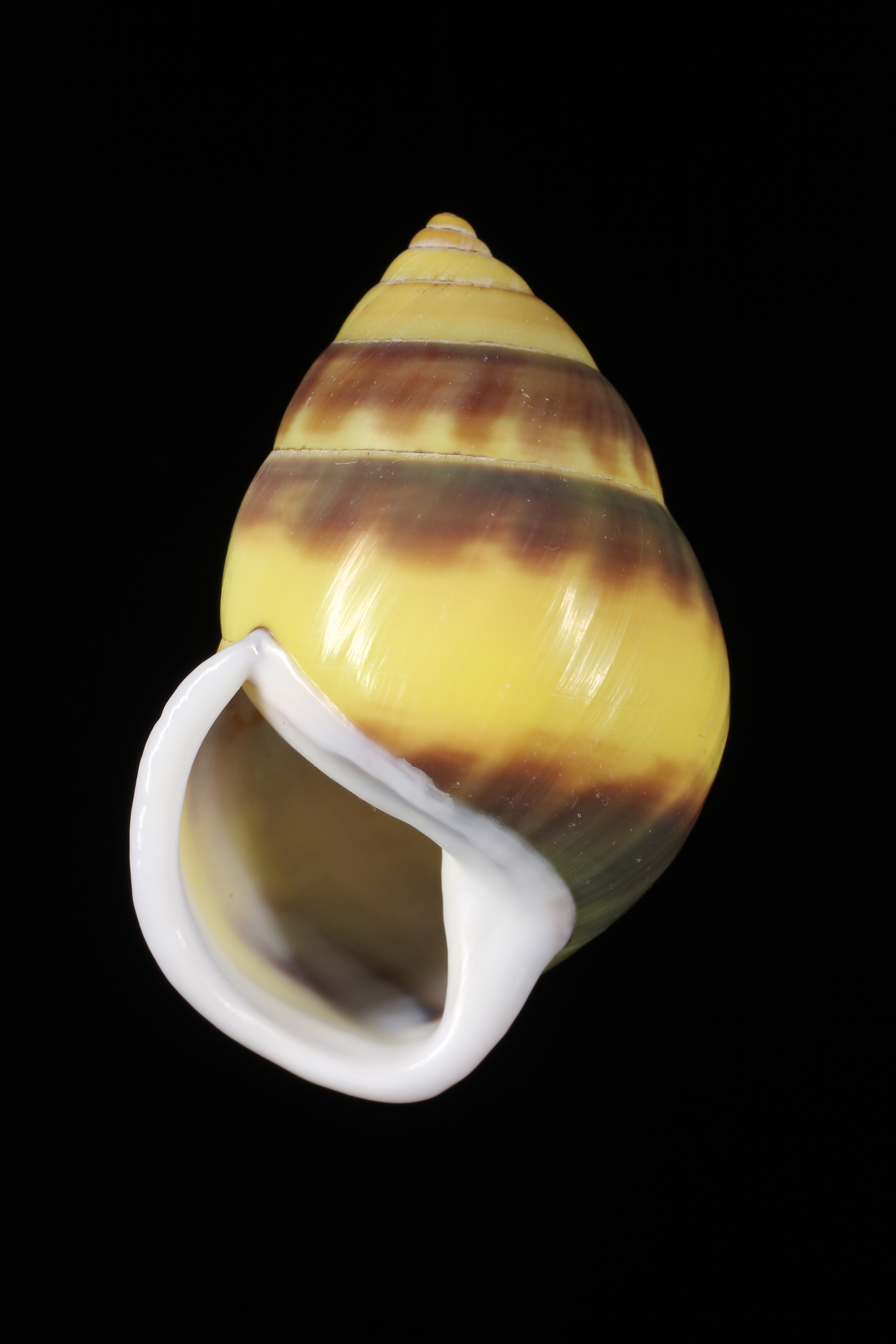
- Shell of Amphidromus huanganhi (holotype at MNHN, Paris)

Scientific classification
- Kingdom: Animalia
- Phylum: Mollusca
- Class: Gastropoda
- Order: Stylommatophora
- Family: Camaenidae
- Genus: Amphidromus
- Species: A. huanganhi

Binomial name
- Amphidromus huanganhi Thach, 2020

= Amphidromus huanganhi =

Species of tree snail

Amphidromus huanganhi is a species of air-breathing tree snail, an arboreal gastropod mollusk in the family Camaenidae.

== Description ==
The length of this sinister shell attains 42.9 mm;

== Distribution ==
This species is endemic to Vietnam.
