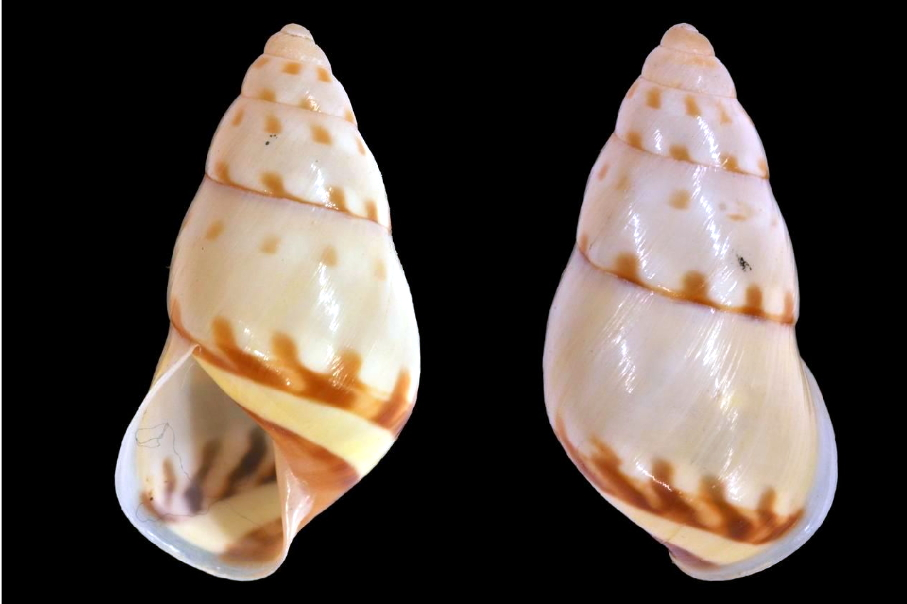
- Shell of Amphidromus singalangensis (paralectotype at the Natural History Museum, London)

Scientific classification
- Kingdom: Animalia
- Phylum: Mollusca
- Class: Gastropoda
- Order: Stylommatophora
- Family: Camaenidae
- Genus: Amphidromus
- Species: A. singalangensis

Binomial name
- Amphidromus singalangensis H. Rolle, 1908

= Amphidromus singalangensis =

Species of tree snail

Amphidromus singalangensis is a species of air-breathing tree snail, an arboreal gastropod mollusk in the family Camaenidae.

== Description ==
The length of this sinister shell attains 27 mm, itsdiameter 16bsp;mm.

(Original description in Latin) The shell is smaller and without an umbilicus. It exhibits a sinistral, ovate-conical shape and a somewhat solid structure. Its surface appears obliquely finely striatulate and glossy, displaying a yellowish base color that is beautifully ornamented with rows of square brown spots on the upper whorls, three rows on the body whorl, and broad bands at the base. The spire presents a regularly conical form with a small whitish apex, and the suture appears distinctly impressed. The shell contains six somewhat convex whorls that increase regularly. The body whorl occupies two-thirds of the shell's height. Here, the upper band peculiarly merges with the lower row of spots, with the spots obliquely transitioning into it with more intense coloration, and the lower band appears broader towards the columella. The aperture has an irregularly pear-shaped form, being dilated below the middle and very oblique, and is yellowish inside with translucent spots and bands. The peristome is white, scarcely thickened, thin, and expanded; its outer margin appears somewhat irregularly arched, while the columellar margin is slightly dilated, appressed, somewhat vertical, not entering, and very shortly reflected.

== Distribution ==
This species is endemic to Sumatra, Indonesia.
