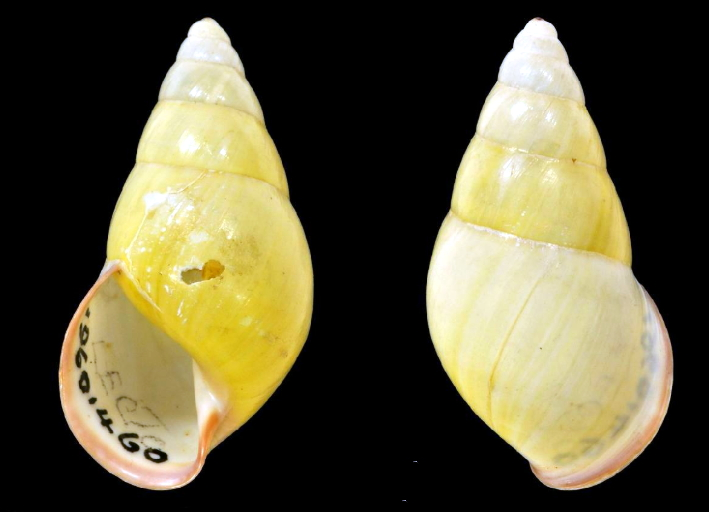
- Shell of Amphidromus placidus (lectotype at NHMUK, London)

Scientific classification
- Kingdom: Animalia
- Phylum: Mollusca
- Class: Gastropoda
- Order: Stylommatophora
- Family: Camaenidae
- Genus: Amphidromus
- Species: A. placidus

Binomial name
- Amphidromus placidus Fulton, 1896

= Amphidromus placidus =

Species of snail in the family Camaenidae

Amphidromus placidus is a species of medium-sized air-breathing tree snail, an arboreal gastropod mollusk in the family Camaenidae.

== Description ==
The length of the shell attains 31 mm, its diameter 16 mm.

(Original description) The sinistral shell is broadly conical, exhibiting a slight perforation and a thin structure. Its surface appears obliquely striate and somewhat angulate at the periphery. Comprising six slightly convex whorls, the apex presents a brown color. The apical whorls are white, transitioning to a pale lemon-color on the lower whorls. The columella is straight and rather thin, slightly expanded and white at its upper part. The outer lip displays a pale purple-brown hue and is expanded and slightly reflected.

== Habitat ==
This species lives in trees.

== Distribution ==
The type locality of this species is Borneo.
