= Amphidromus protania =

Scientific classification
- Kingdom: Animalia
- Phylum: Mollusca
- Class: Gastropoda
- Order: Stylommatophora
- Family: Camaenidae
- Genus: Amphidromus
- Species: A. protania

Binomial name
- Amphidromus protania Lehmann & Maassen, 2004

Synonyms
- Amphidromus (Amphidromus) protania Lehmann & Maassen, 2004 alternative representation

Species of tree snail

Amphidromus protania is a species of air-breathing tree snail, an arboreal gastropod mollusk in the family Camaenidae.

== Discovery ==
The species was discovered during a research trip in June to July of 2003 to Laos. During the trip material from the species was collected which didn't match any previously recorded species. The species was named after the senior researchers daughter, who died at 28 years old.

== Description ==
The length of this shell varies between 26.2 mm and 31.3 mm; its diameter is between 16 mm and 18.4 mm, its color ranges from yellow to white, and contains 6-6.5 slightly convex whorls. The Apex of the shell is dark brown and contains a microsculpture of very small pits.

== Range ==
This dextral species is endemic to Laos.
