= Amphidromus ledaoae =

Scientific classification
- Kingdom: Animalia
- Phylum: Mollusca
- Class: Gastropoda
- Order: Stylommatophora
- Family: Camaenidae
- Genus: Amphidromus
- Species: A. ledaoae

Binomial name
- Amphidromus ledaoae Thach, 2016

Synonyms
- Amphidromus (Syndromus) ledaoae Thach, 2016 alternative representation

Species of snail in the family Camaenidae

Amphidromus ledaoae is a species of medium-sized air-breathing tree snail, an arboreal gastropod mollusk in the family Camaenidae.

Subspecies

- Amphidromus ledaoae ledaoae Thach, 2016
- Amphidromus ledaoae anhi Thach, 2018 (uncertain > taxon inquirendum, debated synonym)

== Distribution ==
This species is endemic to Vietnam
