= Amphidromus fengae =

Scientific classification
- Domain: Eukaryota
- Kingdom: Animalia
- Phylum: Mollusca
- Class: Gastropoda
- Order: Stylommatophora
- Family: Camaenidae
- Genus: Amphidromus
- Species: A. fengae

Binomial name
- Amphidromus fengae Y. C. Wang, 2019

Species of snail in the family Camaenidae

Amphidromus fengae is a species of medium-sized air-breathing tree snail, an arboreal gastropod mollusk in the family Camaenidae.

== Habitat ==
This species lives in trees.

== Distribution ==
The type locality of this species is Thailand.
