= Amphidromus noviae =

Scientific classification
- Kingdom: Animalia
- Phylum: Mollusca
- Class: Gastropoda
- Order: Stylommatophora
- Family: Camaenidae
- Genus: Amphidromus
- Species: A. noviae

Binomial name
- Amphidromus noviae Thach, 2024

Species of tree snail

Amphidromus noviae is a species of air-breathing tree snail, an arboreal gastropod mollusk in the family Camaenidae.

== Description ==
The length of the shell attains 43.1 mm.

== Distribution ==
This species is endemic to Sumatra, Indonesia.
