= Amphidromus delsaerdti =

Scientific classification
- Kingdom: Animalia
- Phylum: Mollusca
- Class: Gastropoda
- Order: Stylommatophora
- Family: Camaenidae
- Genus: Amphidromus
- Species: A. delsaerdti

Binomial name
- Amphidromus delsaerdti Thach, 2016

Species of snail in the family Camaenidae

Amphidromus delsaerdti is a species of medium-sized air-breathing tree snail, an arboreal gastropod mollusk in the family Camaenidae.

== Distribution ==
This species is endemic to Vietnam
