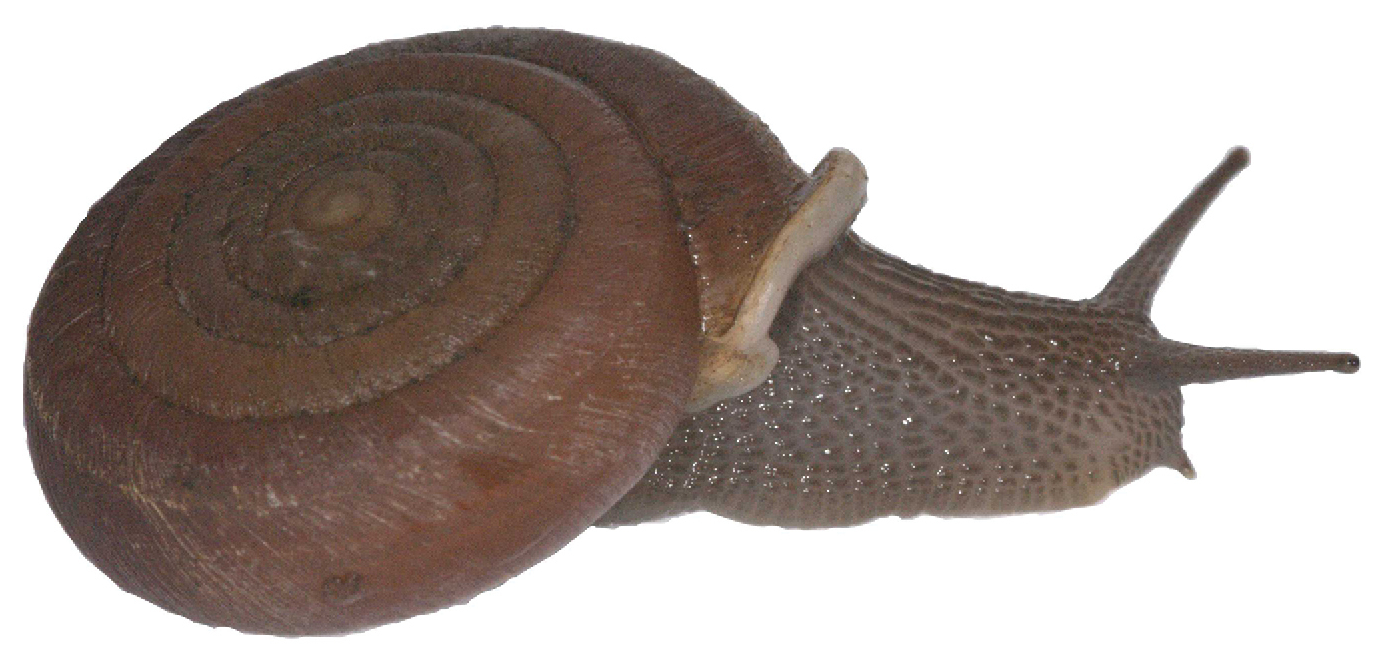
- A live Halongella schlumbergeri

Scientific classification
- Domain: Eukaryota
- Kingdom: Animalia
- Phylum: Mollusca
- Class: Gastropoda
- Order: Stylommatophora
- Family: Plectopylidae
- Genus: Halongella
- Species: H. schlumbergeri

Binomial name
- Halongella schlumbergeri (Morlet, 1886)

Synonyms
- Helix (Plectopylis) Schlumbergeri Morlet, 1886; Gudeodiscus schlumbergeri (Morlet, 1886); Plectopylis jovia Mabille, 1887; Gudeodiscus jovius (Mabille, 1887); Plectopylis (Endoplon) hirsuta Möllendorff, 1901; Gudeodiscus hirsutus (Möllendorff, 1901); Plectopylis pilsbryana Gude, 1901; Gudeodiscus pilsbryana (Gude, 1901)

= Halongella schlumbergeri =

Species of gastropod

Halongella schlumbergeri is a species of air-breathing land snail, a terrestrial pulmonate gastropod mollusk in the family Plectopylidae.

Halongella schlumbergeri the type species of the genus Halongella.

== Distribution ==
The distribution of Halongella schlumbergeri includes Hạ Long Bay area in Haiphong municipality and Quảng Ninh Province, Vietnam.

The type locality is "Baie d’Along et montagne de l’Éléphant".

== Description ==
The most important shell characters for identification of Halongella schlumbergeri include: the shell is robust; callus and aperture shape (including the formation of the fold).

The size of the shell is medium to very large. The shell is thick, almost smooth or with very fine periostracal ribs. The width of the shell is 16.1–28.1 mm. The height of the shell is 7.0–13.1 mm.

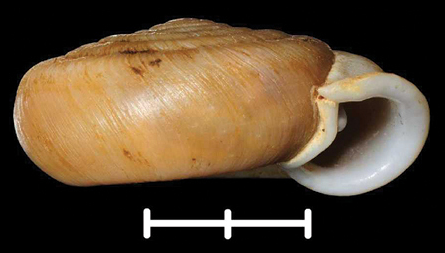
Apertural view. Scale bar is 10 mm.

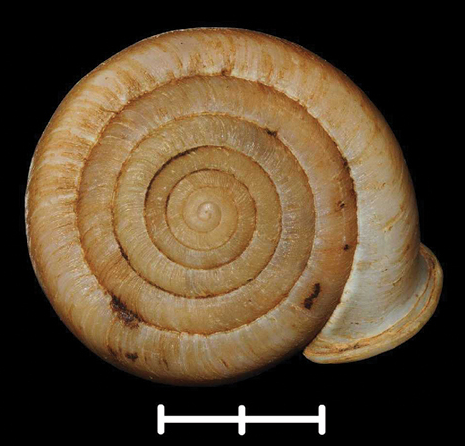
Apical view.

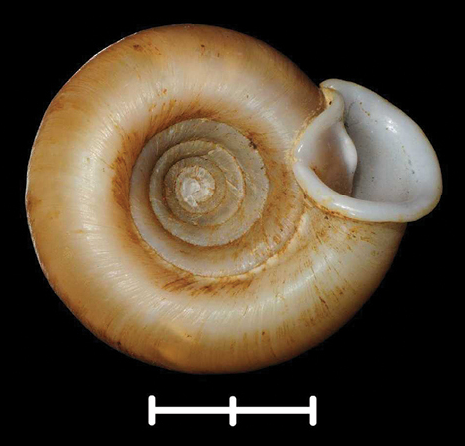
Umbilical view.

The apertural lip is well-developed. The apertural fold is long, more or less equally long in its total length, connected to the callus.

Two oblique apertural views of the same shell:

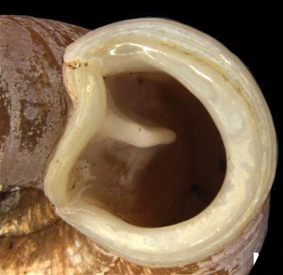
Oblique apertural view.

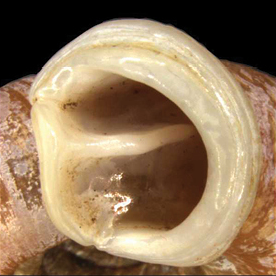
Oblique apertural view.

Parietal wall is with missing or short anterior lamella (always distant from the upper plica) and well-developed posterior lamella. The species is very variable in terms of shell size and the formation of plicae and lamellae on the parietal wall.

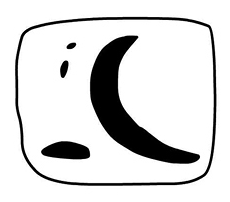
Drawing of parietal plication.

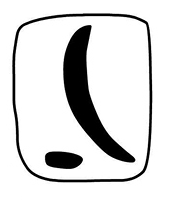
Drawing of parietal plication.

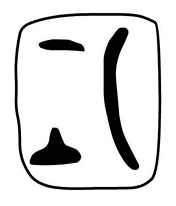
Drawing of parietal plication.

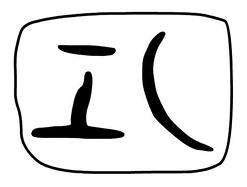
Drawing of parietal plication.

Palatal plicae are depressed and Z-shaped.

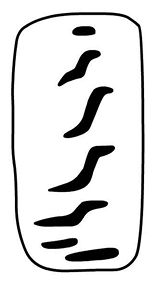
Drawing of inner view the palatal plication.

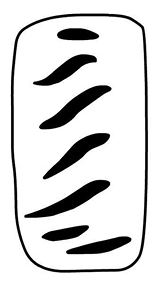
Drawing of inner view the palatal plication.

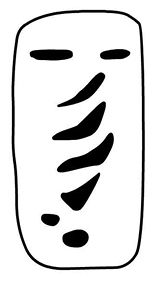
Drawing of inner view the palatal plication.

The radula of Halongella schlumbergeri has 10 lateral teeth and 14 marginal teeth. The size of the central tooth is smaller than the ectocone of the first lateral. The shape of the first lateral is oval. Marginal teeth are bicuspid or tricuspid with blunt inner cusp and shallow incision between the inner two cusps.

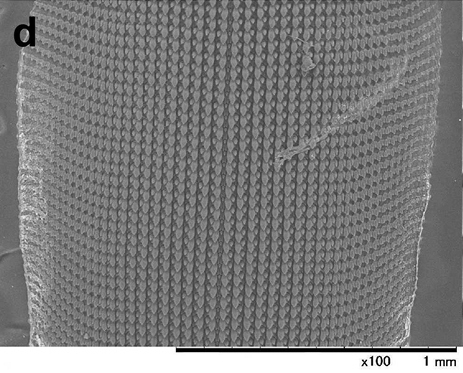
The middle part of radula.

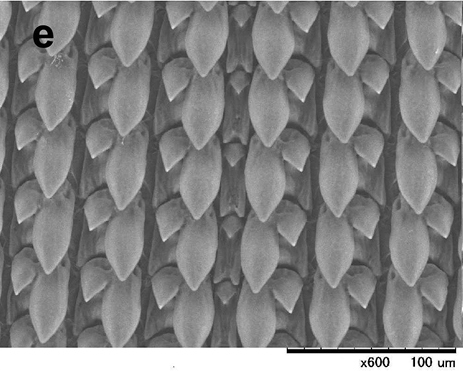
The central tooth and the first 3 pairs of lateral teeth.

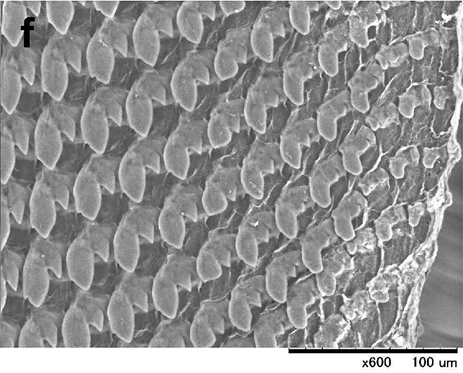
The marginal teeth of radula.

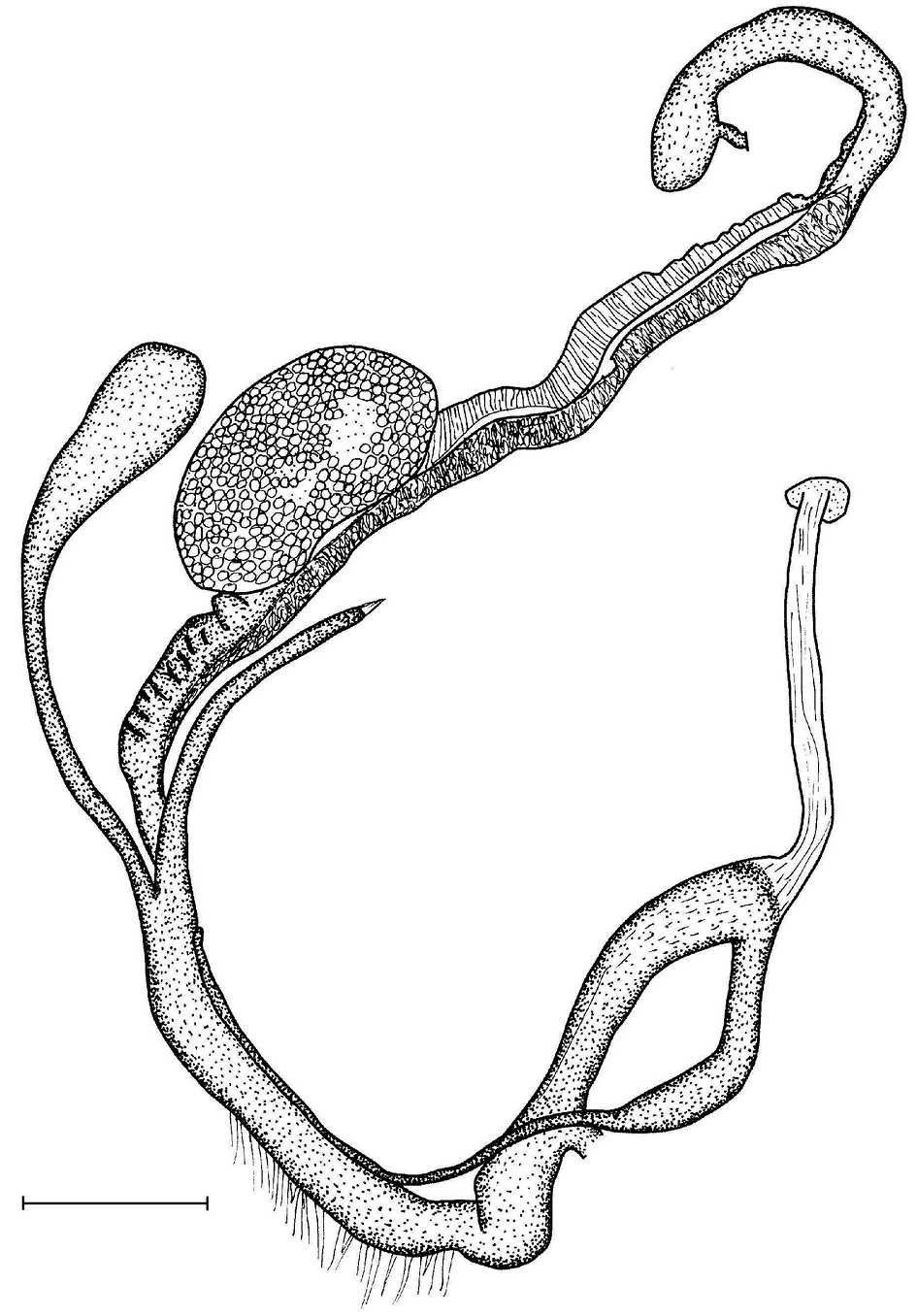
Reproductive system of Halongella schlumbergeri. Scale bar is 5 mm.

The reproductive system was described by Páll-Gergely et al. in 2015. Embryos were recorded to be present in the uterus. There were recorded flat, thin, with no particular shape calcareous granules on the internal surface of penis.

Similar species: Gudeodiscus dautzenbergi and some populations of Gudeodiscus villedaryi resemble Halongella schlumbergeri in terms of general, but the inner lamellae are entirely different. Most Halongella schlumbergeri shells lack the anterior lamella. Gudeodiscus dautzenbergi and Gudeodiscus villedaryi have strong, well-developed anterior lamella with an anteriorly elongated lower “leg”. It is possible to distinguish Halongella schlumbergeri from the other two species without breaking the shell, on the basis of the long apertural fold reaching the callus, which is short in Gudeodiscus dautzenbergi and Gudeodiscus villedaryi, and has an elevated “knob” part in some distance from the callus.

== Ecology ==
It is a ground-dwelling species as all other plectopylid snails in Vietnam.
