= Chersaecia =

Scientific classification
- Kingdom: Animalia
- Phylum: Mollusca
- Class: Gastropoda
- Order: Stylommatophora
- Infraorder: incertae sedis
- Superfamily: Plectopyloidea
- Family: Plectopylidae
- Genus: Chersaecia; Gude, 1899

Type species
- Helix leiophis Benson, 1860

Synonyms
- Endoplon Gude, 1899 (junior synonym); Plectopylis (Chersaecia) Gude, 1899 (original rank); Plectopylis (Endoplon) Gude, 1899 (original rank)

Genus of gastropods

Chersaecia is a genus of air-breathing land snails, terrestrial pulmonate gastropod mollusks in the family Plectopylidae.

== Species ==
Species in the genus Chersaecia include:

- Chersaecia auffenbergi Páll-Gergely, 2018
- Chersaecia austeni (Gude, 1899)
- Chersaecia brachyplecta (Benson, 1863)
- Chersaecia densegyrata Páll-Gergely, 2018
- Chersaecia dextrorsa (Benson, 1860)
- Chersaecia feddeni (W. T. Blanford, 1865)
- Chersaecia goniobathmos (Ehrmann, 1922)
- Chersaecia leiophis (Benson, 1860)
- Chersaecia leucochila (Gude, 1898)
- Chersaecia magna (Gude, 1897)
- Chersaecia mogokensis Páll-Gergely, 2018
- Chersaecia nagaensis (Godwin-Austen, 1875)
- Chersaecia perarcta (W. T. Blanford, 1865)
- Chersaecia perrierae (Gude, 1898)
- Chersaecia refuga (Gould, 1846)
- Chersaecia reversalis Páll-Gergely, 2018
- Chersaecia scabra Páll-Gergely, 2018
- Chersaecia shanensis (Stoliczka, 1873)
- Chersaecia shiroiensis (Godwin-Austen, 1875)
- Chersaecia smithiana (Gude, 1897)
- Chersaecia woodthorpei (Gude, 1899)
