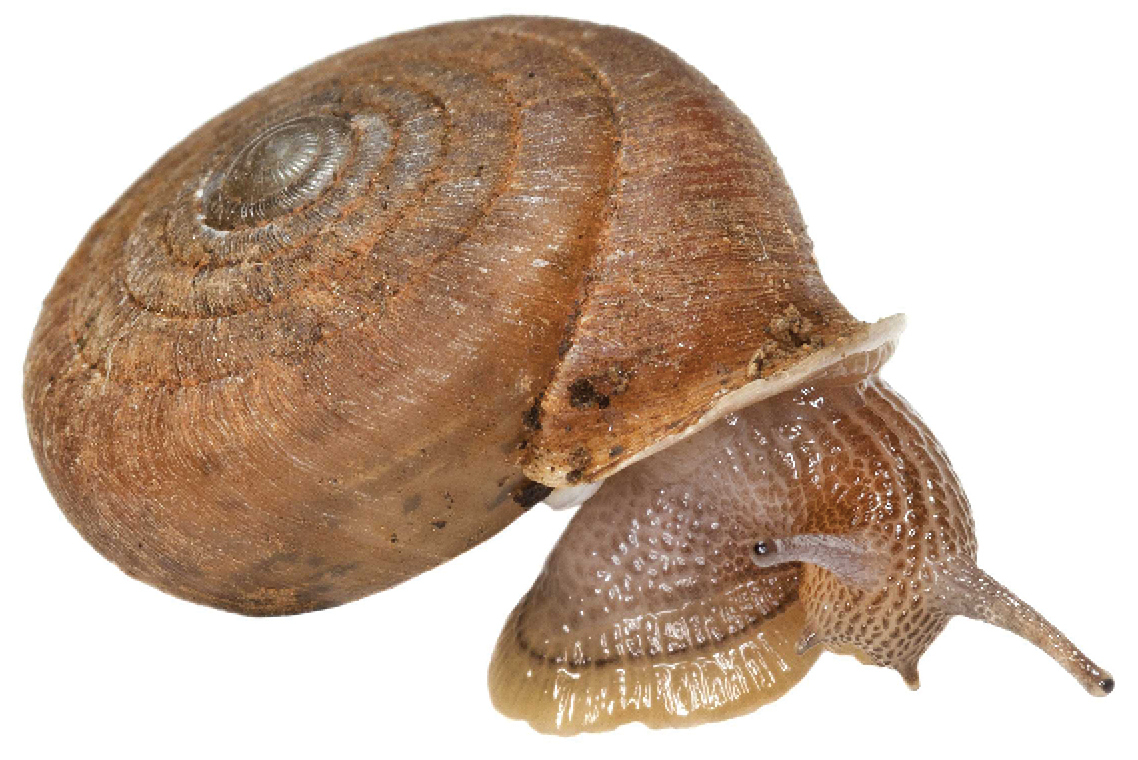
- a live Gudeodiscus giardi giardi

Scientific classification
- Kingdom: Animalia
- Phylum: Mollusca
- Class: Gastropoda
- Order: Stylommatophora
- Family: Plectopylidae
- Genus: Gudeodiscus
- Species: G. giardi

Binomial name
- Gudeodiscus giardi (H. Fischer, 1898)

Synonyms
- Plectopylis Giardi Fischer, 1898; Plectopylis giardi Fischer, 1898; Plectopylis congesta Gude, 1899; Gudeodiscus congestus (Gude, 1899)

= Gudeodiscus giardi =

Species of gastropod

Gudeodiscus giardi is a species of air-breathing land snail, a terrestrial pulmonate gastropod mollusk in the family Plectopylidae.

This species was described by French zoologist Pierre Marie Henri Fischer (1865-1916) (son of Paul Henri Fischer) in 1898.

== Subspecies ==
- Gudeodiscus giardi giardi (Fischer, 1898)
- Gudeodiscus giardi oharai Páll-Gergely, 2013
- Gudeodiscus giardi szekeresi Páll-Gergely & Hunyadi, 2013

The specific name giardi is in honor of French zoologist Alfred Mathieu Giard. The subspecific name oharai is in honor of the collector Kenji Ohara. The subspecific name szekeresi is in honor of the malacologist Miklós Szekeres.

== Distribution ==
The distribution of Gudeodiscus giardi includes Cao Bằng Province and the northern part of Lạng Sơn Province in Vietnam and western Guangxi in China.

The type locality of Gudeodiscus giardi giardi is "Cao-Bang". Gudeodiscus giardi giardi lives in Vietnam and China. Gudeodiscus giardi oharai lives in are north of Nanning in Western Guangxi, China. Gudeodiscus giardi szekeresi live in the type locality only: Langur Reserve, 25 km southeast of Chongzuo, China.

== Description ==
The most important shell characters for identification of Gudeodiscus giardi include: high and rather sharply defined shell shape, narrow umbilicus (for the genus Gudeodiscus) and thick peristome.

The size of the shell is small to large. The shape of the shell is high and rather sharply defined. The color of the shell is brownish, but some Chinese populations are small and yellow and translucent. The sculpture is usually finely reticulated, that is resulting in a matt surface. The umbilicus is deep. Apertural lip, callus and apertural fold are very well-developed (callus is very much elevated). Parietal wall has two lamellae. The anterior lamella is usually connected to the lower plica. Middle palatal plicae are short, depressed Z-shaped, or almost vertical, sometimes connected to each other. The width of the shell 13.5–21.3 mm. The height of the shell is 7.0–12.1 mm.

The radula of Gudeodiscus giardi has 12 lateral teeth and 15 marginal teeth. The size of the central tooth is as large as the ectocone of the first lateral. The shape of the first lateral is rhomboid and pointed. Marginal teeth are bicuspid or tricuspid with blunt inner cusp and shallow incision between the inner two cusps.

The reproductive system of specimen from China was described by Páll-Gergely & Asami in 2014 and from Vietnam by Páll-Gergely et al. in 2015. Embryos were not recorded in the uterus. There were recorded hook-like or flat and oval calcareous granules on the internal surface of penis.

== Ecology ==
It is a ground-dwelling species as all other plectopylid snails in Vietnam.

It co-occur with other plectopylids in Vietnam: with Gudeodiscus anceyi, Gudeodiscus francoisi, Sicradiscus mansuyi and with Gudeodiscus suprafilaris. Gudeodiscus phlyarius live at geographically close sites to Gudeodiscus giardi.
