= Gudeodiscus suprafilaris =

Scientific classification
- Kingdom: Animalia
- Phylum: Mollusca
- Class: Gastropoda
- Order: Stylommatophora
- Family: Plectopylidae
- Genus: Gudeodiscus
- Species: G. suprafilaris

Binomial name
- Gudeodiscus suprafilaris (Gude, 1908)

Synonyms
- Plectopylis suprafilaris Gude, 1908

Species of gastropod

Gudeodiscus suprafilaris is a species of air-breathing land snail, a terrestrial pulmonate gastropod mollusk in the family Plectopylidae.

== Distribution ==
The distribution of Gudeodiscus suprafilaris includes Vietnam.

The type locality is "Tonkin, Quang-Huyen".

== Ecology ==
It is a ground-dwelling species as all other plectopylid snails in Vietnam.

It co-occur with other plectopylids in Vietnam: with Gudeodiscus giardi and with Sicradiscus mansuyi. Gudeodiscus anceyi, Gudeodiscus francoisi and Gudeodiscus phlyarius live at geographically close sites to Gudeodiscus suprafilaris.
