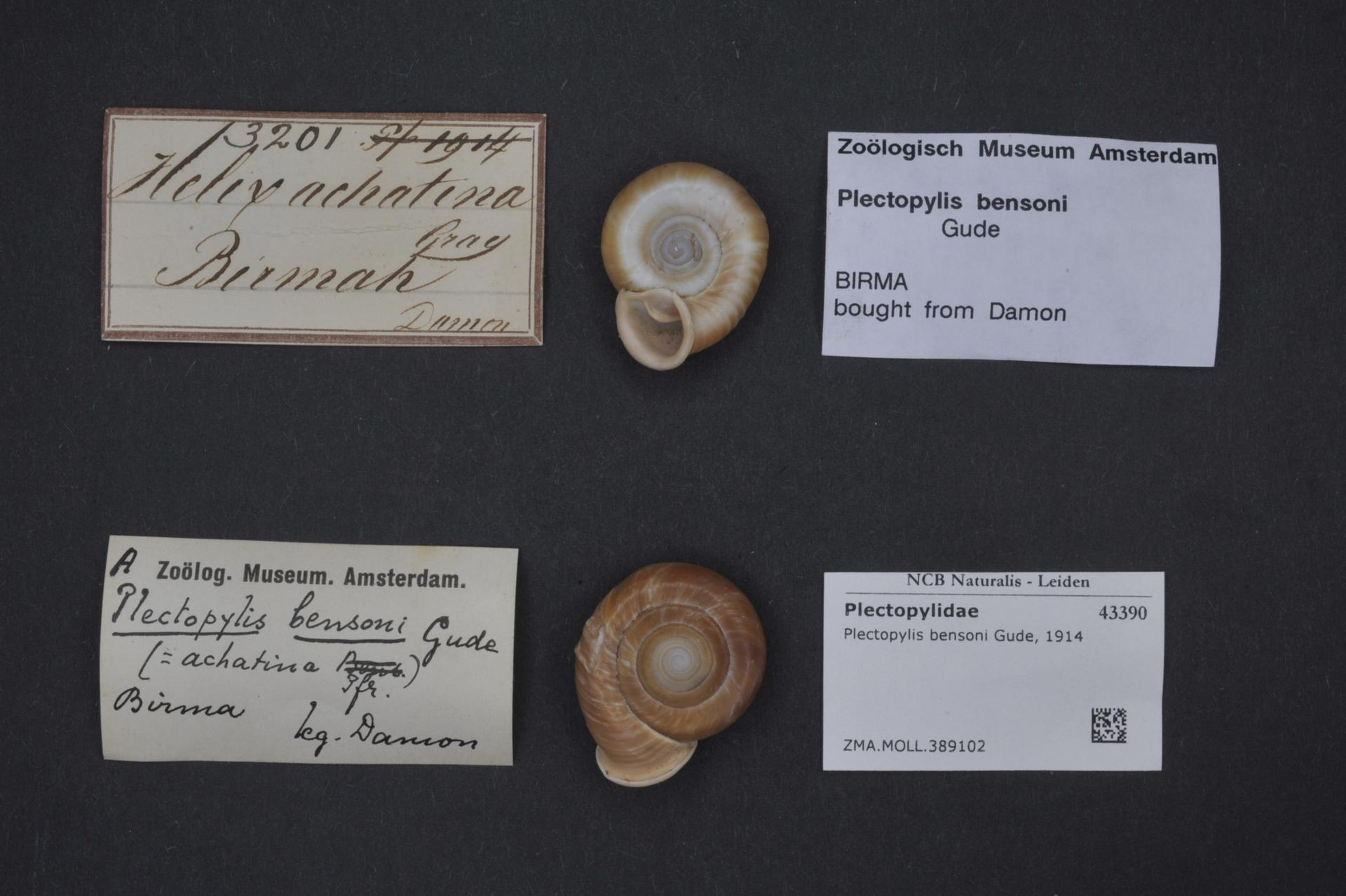
- Plectopylis bensoni shells

Scientific classification
- Kingdom: Animalia
- Phylum: Mollusca
- Class: Gastropoda
- Order: Stylommatophora
- Suborder: Helicina
- Superfamily: Plectopyloidea
- Family: Plectopylidae
- Genus: Plectopylis; Benson, 1860

= Plectopylis =

Genus of gastropods

Plectopylis is a genus of air-breathing land snails, terrestrial pulmonate gastropod mollusks in the family Plectopylidae.

Plectopylis is the type genus of the family Plectopylidae.

== Species ==
Species in the genus Plectopylis include:

- Plectopylis anguina (Gould, 1847)
- † Plectopylis antiquus Yü & Pan, 1982
- Plectopylis cairnsi (Gude, 1898)
- Plectopylis crassilabris Páll-Gergely, 2018
- Plectopylis cyclaspis (Benson, 1859) - synonym: Plectopylis revoluta Pfeiffer, 1867
- Plectopylis feddeni (W. Blanford, 1865)
- Plectopylis karenorum (W. Blanford, 1865)
- Plectopylis linterae (Möllendorff, 1897)
- Plectopylis malayana Páll-Gergely, 2018
- Plectopylis ponsonbyi (Godwin-Austen, 1888)
- Plectopylis repercussa (Gould, 1856)
- Plectopylis thompsoni Páll-Gergely, 2018

Species brought into synonymy

- Plectopylis bensoni (Gude, 1914): synonym of Plectopylis repercussa (Gould, 1856)
- Plectopylis goniobathmos (Ehrmann, 1922): synonym of Chersaecia goniobathmos (Ehrmann, 1922) (original combination)
- Plectopylis leucochilus (Gude, 1897): synonym of Chersaecia leucochila (Gude, 1898) (original combination)
- Plectopylis lissochlamys (Gude, 1897): synonym of Chersaecia magna (Gude, 1897) (junior synonym)
- Plectopylis magna (Gude, 1897): synonym of Chersaecia magna (Gude, 1897) (original combination)
- Plectopylis woodthorpei (Gude, 1899): synonym of Chersaecia woodthorpei (Gude, 1899) (original combination)
