= Gudeodiscus infralevis =

Scientific classification
- Kingdom: Animalia
- Phylum: Mollusca
- Class: Gastropoda
- Order: Stylommatophora
- Family: Plectopylidae
- Genus: Gudeodiscus
- Species: G. infralevis

Binomial name
- Gudeodiscus infralevis (Gude, 1908)

Synonyms
- Plectopylis infralevis Gude, 1908; Plectopylis soror Gude, 1908; Gudeodiscus soror (Gude, 1908)

Species of gastropod

Gudeodiscus infralevis is a species of air-breathing land snail, a terrestrial pulmonate gastropod mollusk in the family Plectopylidae.

== Distribution ==
The distribution of Gudeodiscus infralevis includes Vietnam.

The type locality is "Tonkin, Quang-Huyen".

== Ecology ==
It is a ground-dwelling species as all other plectopylid snails in Vietnam.
