= Gudeodiscus fischeri =

Scientific classification
- Kingdom: Animalia
- Phylum: Mollusca
- Class: Gastropoda
- Order: Stylommatophora
- Family: Plectopylidae
- Genus: Gudeodiscus
- Species: G. fischeri

Binomial name
- Gudeodiscus fischeri (Gude, 1901)

Synonyms
- Plectopylis fischeri Gude, 1901; Plectopylis tenuis Gude, 1901; Gudeodiscus tenuis (Gude, 1901)

Species of gastropod

Gudeodiscus fischeri is a species of air-breathing land snail, a terrestrial pulmonate gastropod mollusk in the family Plectopylidae.

== Distribution ==
The distribution of Gudeodiscus fischeri includes Vietnam.

== Ecology ==
It is a ground-dwelling species as all other plectopylid snails in Vietnam.

Gudeodiscus anceyi and Gudeodiscus emigrans quadrilamellatus live at geographically close sites to Gudeodiscus fischeri.
