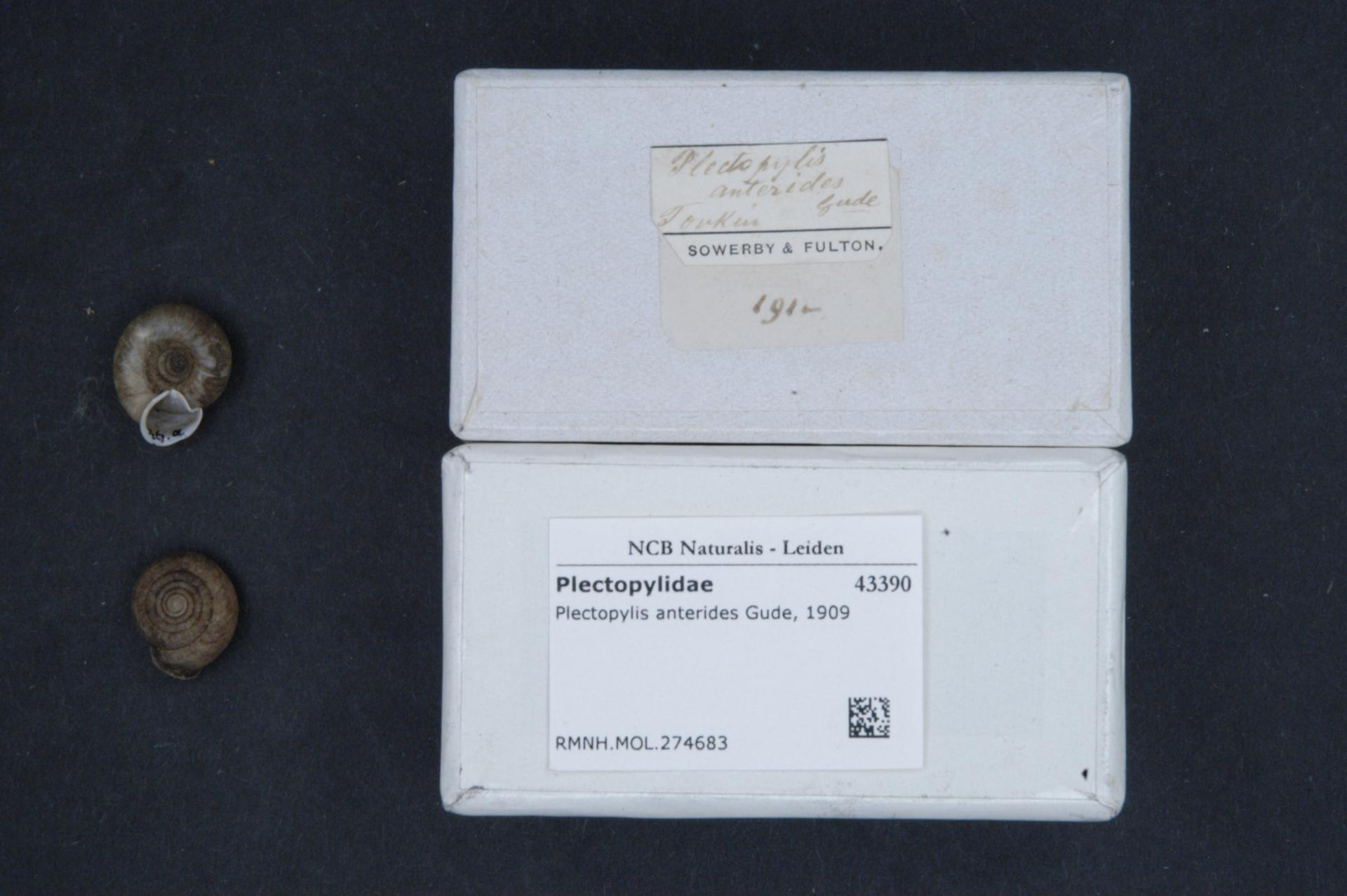
- Gudeodiscus phlyarius shells

Scientific classification
- Domain: Eukaryota
- Kingdom: Animalia
- Phylum: Mollusca
- Class: Gastropoda
- Order: Stylommatophora
- Family: Plectopylidae
- Genus: Gudeodiscus
- Species: G. phlyarius

Binomial name
- Gudeodiscus phlyarius (Mabille, 1887)

Synonyms
- Plectopylis phlyaria Mabille, 1887; Plectopylis (Endoplon) moellendorffi Gude, 1901; Gudeodiscus moellendorffi (Gude, 1901); Plectopylis gouldingi Gude, 1909; Gudeodiscus gouldingi (Gude, 1909); Plectopylis verecunda Gude, 1909; Gudeodiscus verecundus (Gude, 1909); Plectopylis fallax Gude, 1909; Gudeodiscus fallax (Gude, 1909); Plectopylis anterides Gude, 1909; Gudeodiscus anterides (Gude, 1909); Gudeodiscus phlyarius werneri Páll-Gergely, 2013

= Gudeodiscus phlyarius =

Species of gastropod

Gudeodiscus phlyarius is a species of air-breathing land snail, a terrestrial pulmonate gastropod mollusk in the family Plectopylidae.

Gudeodiscus phlyarius is the type species of the genus Gudeodiscus.

== Distribution ==
The distribution of Gudeodiscus phlyarius includes Vietnam.

== Ecology ==
It is a ground-dwelling species as all other plectopylid snails in Vietnam.

It co-occur with other plectopylids in Vietnam: with Gudeodiscus anceyi, Gudeodiscus messageri raheemi and with Gudeodiscus villedaryi. Gudeodiscus francoisi, Gudeodiscus giardi, Sicradiscus mansuyi, Gudeodiscus dautzenbergi and Gudeodiscus suprafilaris live at geographically close sites to Gudeodiscus phlyarius.
