= Gudeodiscus cyrtochilus =

Scientific classification
- Kingdom: Animalia
- Phylum: Mollusca
- Class: Gastropoda
- Order: Stylommatophora
- Family: Plectopylidae
- Genus: Gudeodiscus
- Species: G. cyrtochilus

Binomial name
- Gudeodiscus cyrtochilus (Gude, 1909)

Synonyms
- Plectopylis cyrtochila Gude, 1909

Species of gastropod

Gudeodiscus cyrtochilus is a species of air-breathing land snail, a terrestrial pulmonate gastropod mollusk in the family Plectopylidae.

== Distribution ==
The distribution of Gudeodiscus cyrtochilus includes Vietnam.

== Ecology ==
It is a ground-dwelling species as all other plectopylid snails in Vietnam.

It co-occur with other plectopylids in Vietnam: with Sicradiscus mansuyi.
