= Sicradiscus mansuyi =

Scientific classification
- Kingdom: Animalia
- Phylum: Mollusca
- Class: Gastropoda
- Order: Stylommatophora
- Family: Plectopylidae
- Genus: Sicradiscus
- Species: S. mansuyi

Binomial name
- Sicradiscus mansuyi (Gude, 1908)

Synonyms
- Plectopylis mansuyi Gude, 1908

Species of gastropod

Sicradiscus mansuyi is a species of air-breathing land snail, a terrestrial pulmonate gastropod mollusc in the family Plectopylidae.

== Distribution ==
The distribution of Sicradiscus mansuyi includes Cao Bằng Province and Hà Giang Province in Northeast Vietnam. It was also found in Ban Gioc–Detian Falls very close to the Vietnamese border within Daxin County, Guangxi, China.

The type locality is Hạ Lang in the eastern part of Cao Bằng Province, in the Northeast region of Vietnam.

== Description ==
The width of the shell is 6.7–7.0 mm. The height of the shell is 3.4–3.9 mm.

== Ecology ==
It is a ground-dwelling species as all other plectopylid snails in Vietnam.

It co-occur with other plectopylids in Vietnam: with Gudeodiscus cyrtochilus, Gudeodiscus giardi and with Gudeodiscus suprafilaris. Gudeodiscus phlyarius live at geographically close sites to Sicradiscus mansuyi.
