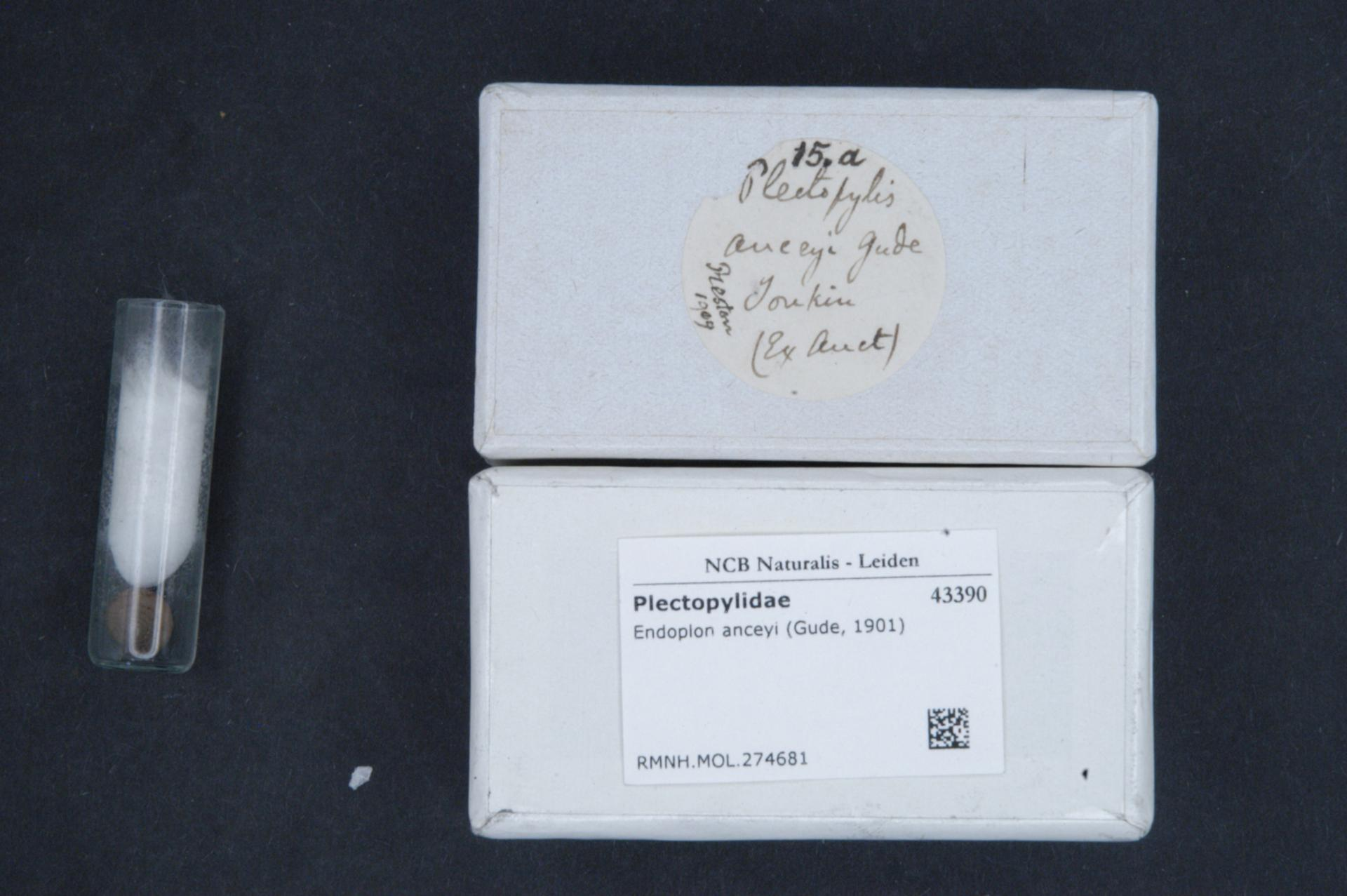
- Gudeodiscus anceyi shell

Scientific classification
- Kingdom: Animalia
- Phylum: Mollusca
- Class: Gastropoda
- Order: Stylommatophora
- Family: Plectopylidae
- Genus: Gudeodiscus
- Species: G. anceyi

Binomial name
- Gudeodiscus anceyi (Gude, 1901)

Synonyms
- Plectopylis Anceyi Gude, 1901; Endoplon anceyi (Gude, 1901)

= Gudeodiscus anceyi =

Species of gastropod

Gudeodiscus anceyi is a species of air-breathing land snail, a terrestrial pulmonate gastropod mollusk in the family Plectopylidae.

== Distribution ==
The distribution of Gudeodiscus anceyi includes Vietnam.

== Ecology ==
It is a ground-dwelling species as all other plectopylid snails in Vietnam.

It co-occur with other plectopylids in Vietnam: with Gudeodiscus francoisi, Gudeodiscus giardi, Gudeodiscus phlyarius, Gudeodiscus emigrans quadrilamellatus and with Gudeodiscus villedaryi. Gudeodiscus fischeri and Gudeodiscus suprafilaris live at geographically close sites to Gudeodiscus anceyi.
