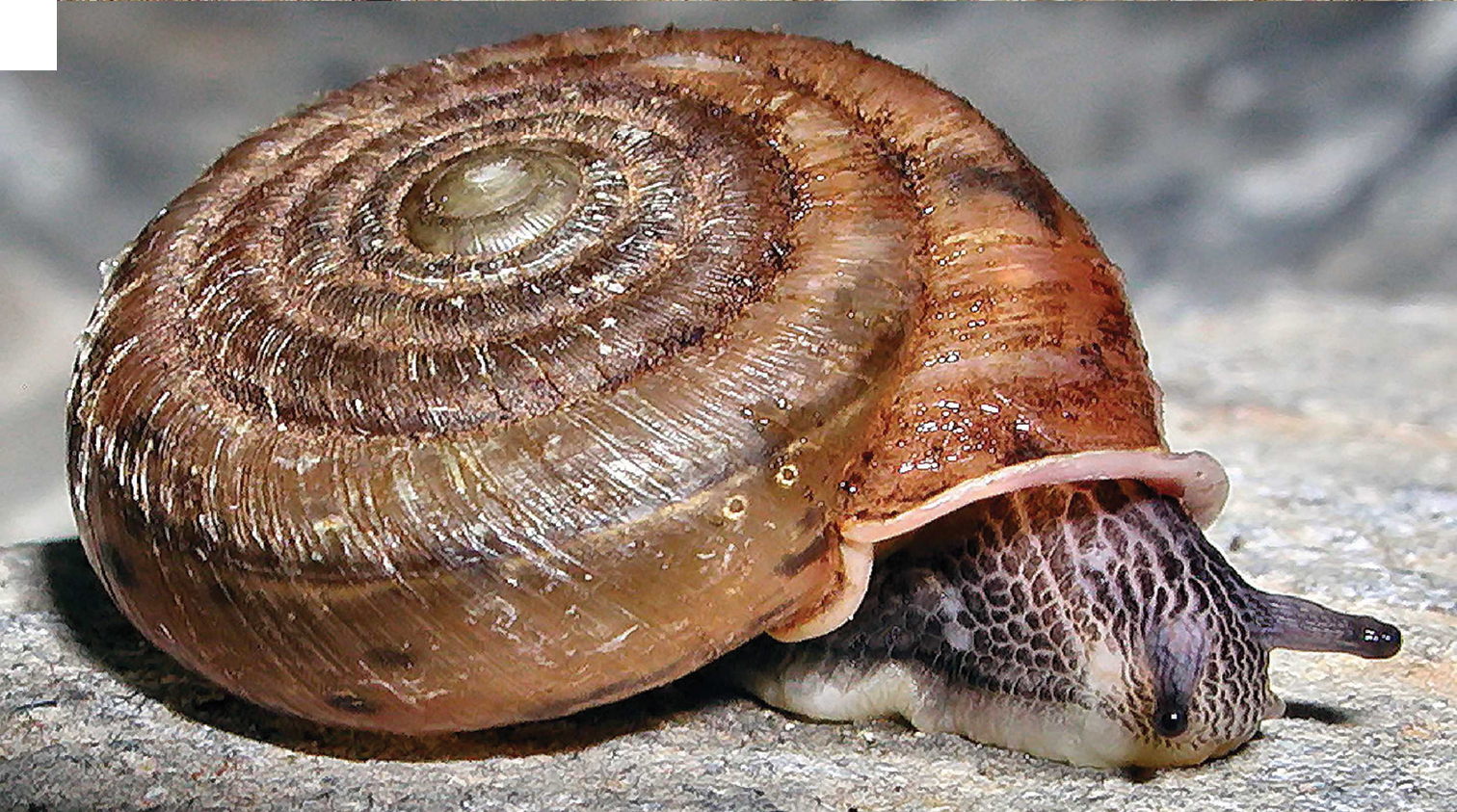
- Gudeodiscus messageri raheemi

Scientific classification
- Kingdom: Animalia
- Phylum: Mollusca
- Class: Gastropoda
- Order: Stylommatophora
- Family: Plectopylidae
- Genus: Gudeodiscus
- Species: G. messageri

Binomial name
- Gudeodiscus messageri (Gude, 1909)

Synonyms
- Plectopylis messageri Gude, 1909

= Gudeodiscus messageri =

Species of gastropod

Gudeodiscus messageri is a species of air-breathing land snail, a terrestrial pulmonate gastropod mollusk in the family Plectopylidae.

== Subspecies ==
Gudeodiscus messageri include two subspecies:

- Gudeodiscus messageri messageri (Gude, 1909)
- Gudeodiscus messageri raheemi Páll-Gergely & Hunyadi, 2015

== Distribution ==
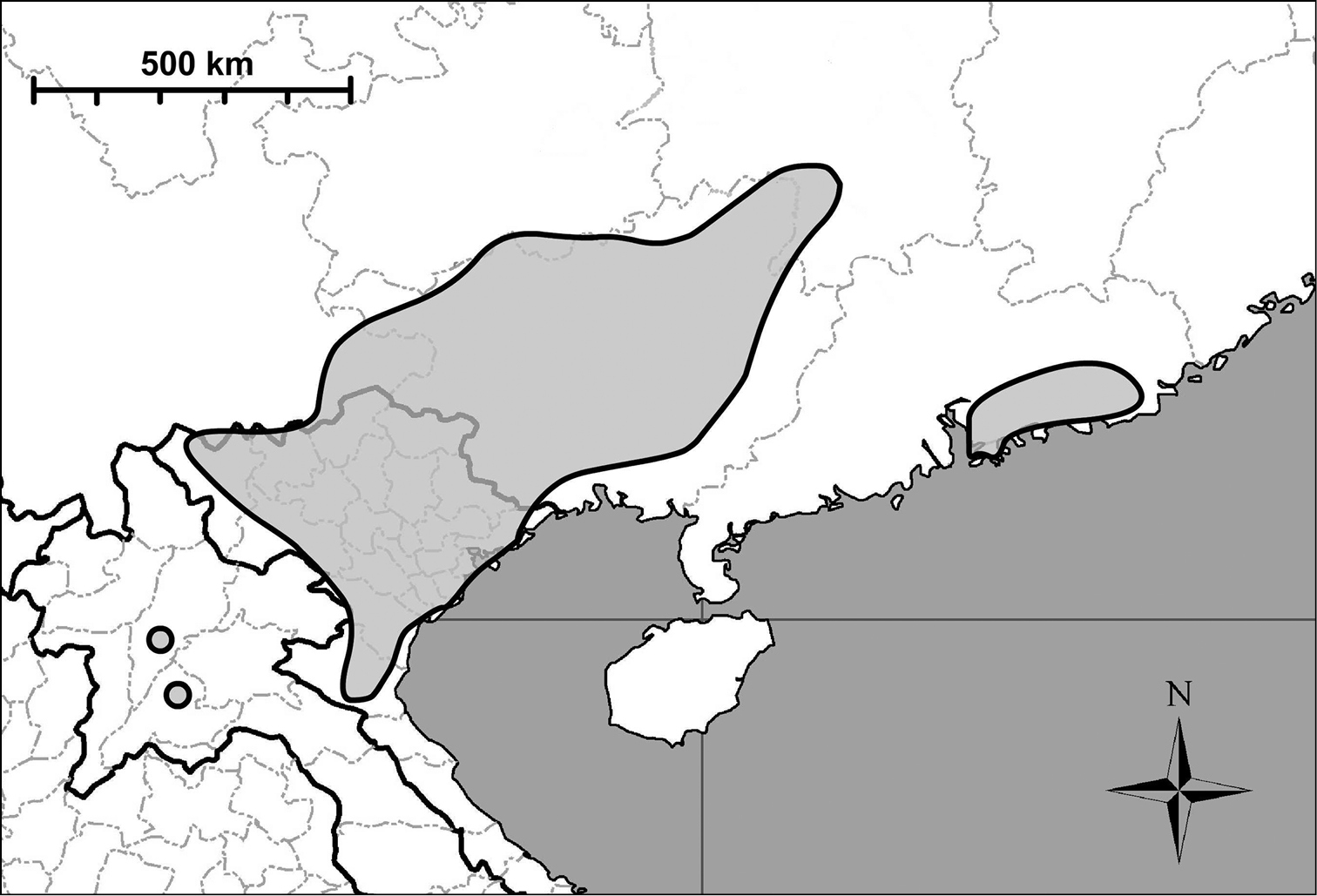
Distribution map of the genus Gudeodiscus. The small circles in Laos indicates the 2016 localities of Gudeodiscus messageri raheemi.

The distribution of Gudeodiscus messageri messageri is known from Vietnam along the Chinese border (Yunnan Province).

The distribution of Gudeodiscus messageri raheemi is known from Vietnam from Ninh Bình Province, Thanh Hóa Province, Sơn La Province, Hòa Bình Province and Nghệ An Province and from Luang Prabang Province in north Laos and Vientiane Province in northwest Laos. Gudeodiscus messageri raheemi in Laos is the westernmost record of the genus Gudeodiscus.

== Description ==
The shell of Gudeodiscus messageri is small to medium-sized, with slightly elevated spire. The dorsal surface is somewhat domed. The aperture is almost circular. The apertural fold is missing. Callus is rather blunt and only slightly curved. Parietal wall has two lamellae (the anterior lamella may be dissolved into small denticles). Lower parietal plica is free or connected to the anterior lamella. Palatal plicae are oblique, or depressed Z-shaped, usually in contact with each other.

=== Gudeodiscus messageri messageri ===
The most important shell characters for identification of Gudeodiscus messageri messageri include: slightly elevated spire, callus is not angled in the middle, apertural fold is always missing. Other characteristics include: anterior lamella is normal (it is not dissolved into small denticles). Lower parietal plica does not extend beyond the anterior lamella in the anterior direction. The width of the shell is 12.75–18.5 mm.

Views of the shell of Gudeodiscus messageri messageri by Gerard Pierre Laurent Kalshoven Gude:

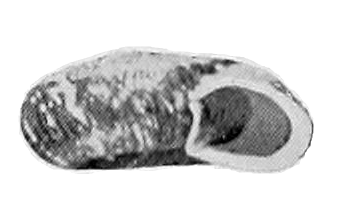
Apertural view.

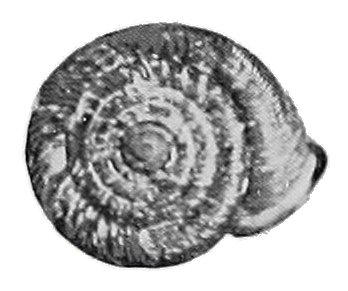
Apical view.

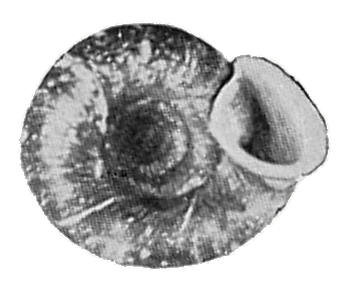
Umbilical view.

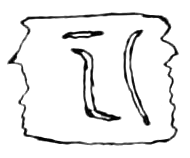
Drawing of parietal plication of Gudeodiscus messageri messageri.

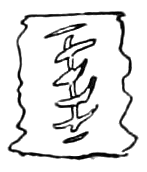
Drawing of palatal plication of Gudeodiscus messageri messageri.

=== Gudeodiscus messageri raheemi ===
The most important shell characters for identification of Gudeodiscus messageri raheemi include: body whorl is less shouldered than that of the nominotypical subspecies, but plicae have to be observed for correct identification.

Views of the shell of Gudeodiscus messageri raheemi:

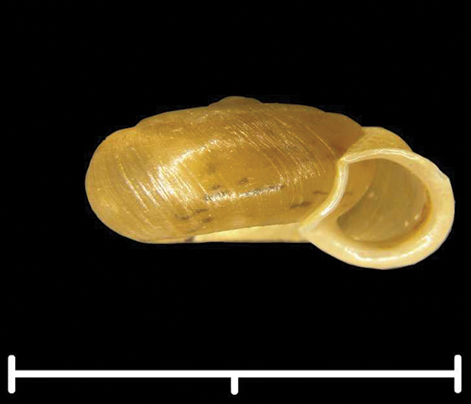
Apertural view. Scale bar is 20 mm.

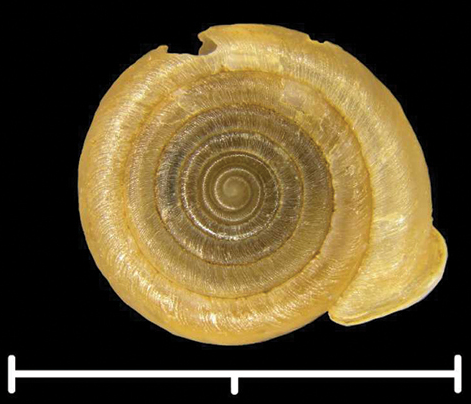
Apical view.

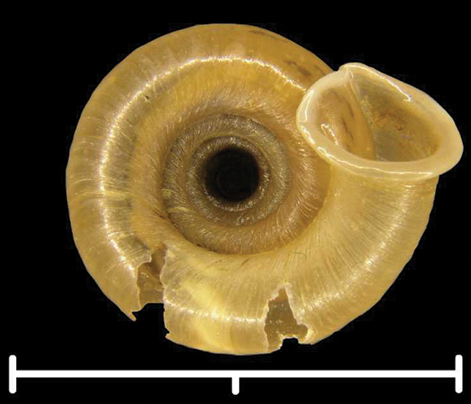
Umbilical view.

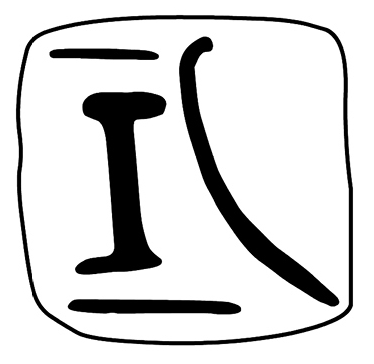
Drawing of parietal plication of Gudeodiscus messageri raheemi.

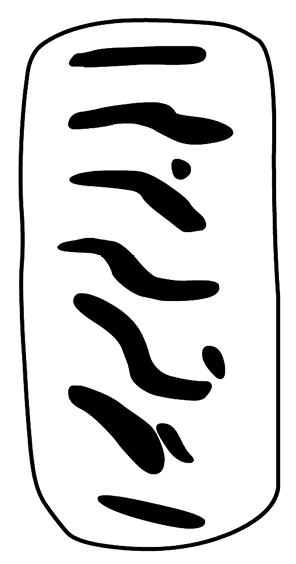
Drawing of palatal plication of Gudeodiscus messageri raheemi.

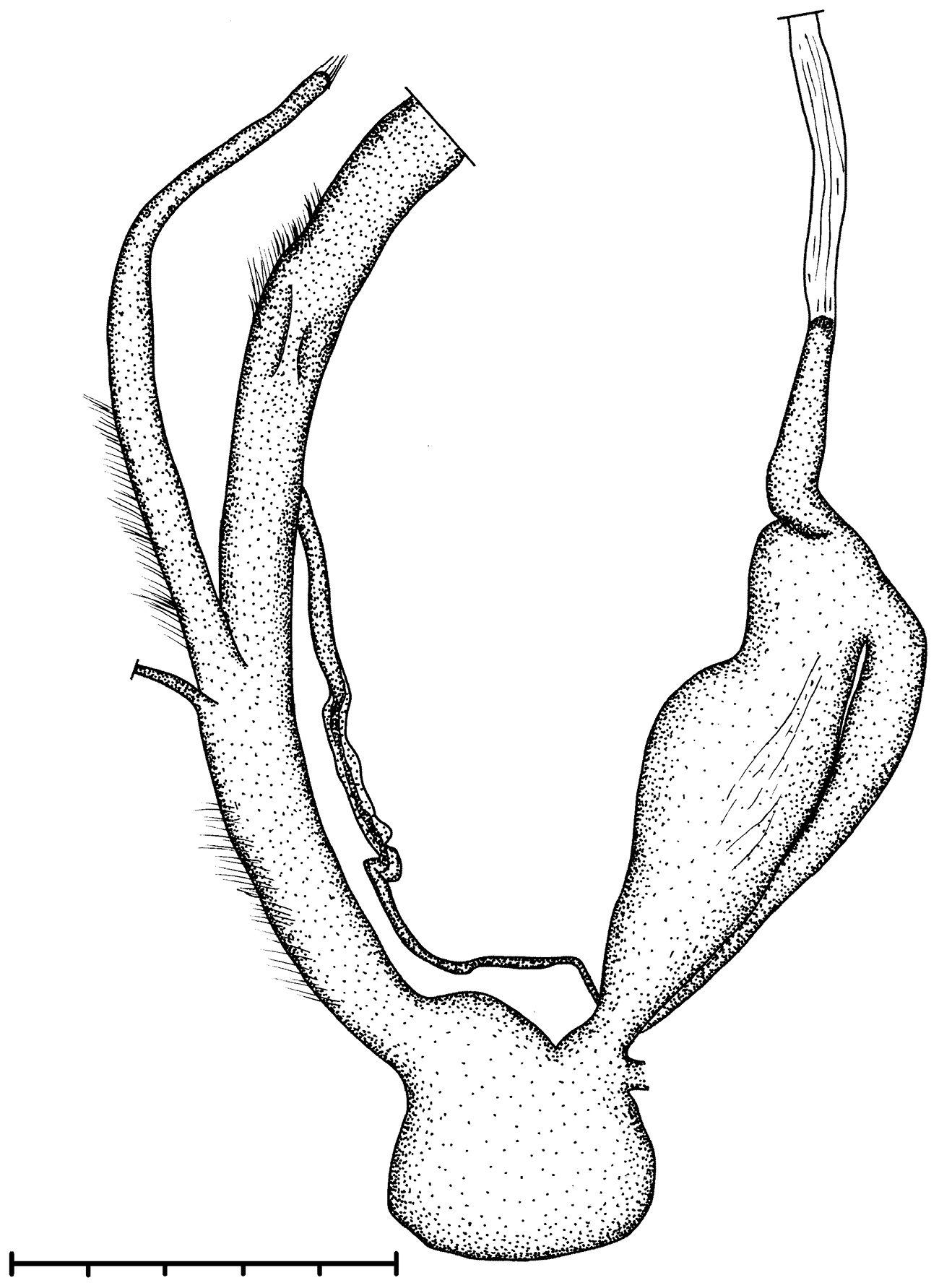
Drawing of the reproductive system of Gudeodiscus messageri raheemi. Scale bar is 5 mm.

The radula of Gudeodiscus messageri raheemi has 8 lateral teeth and 16 marginal teeth. The size of the central tooth is as large as or larger than the ectocone of the first lateral. The shape of the first lateral is rhomboid and pointed. Marginal teeth are tricuspid with rather sharp inner cusp and deep incision between the cusps.

Embryos were recorded to be present in the uterus. There were not recorded calcareous granules on the internal surface of penis.

== Ecology ==
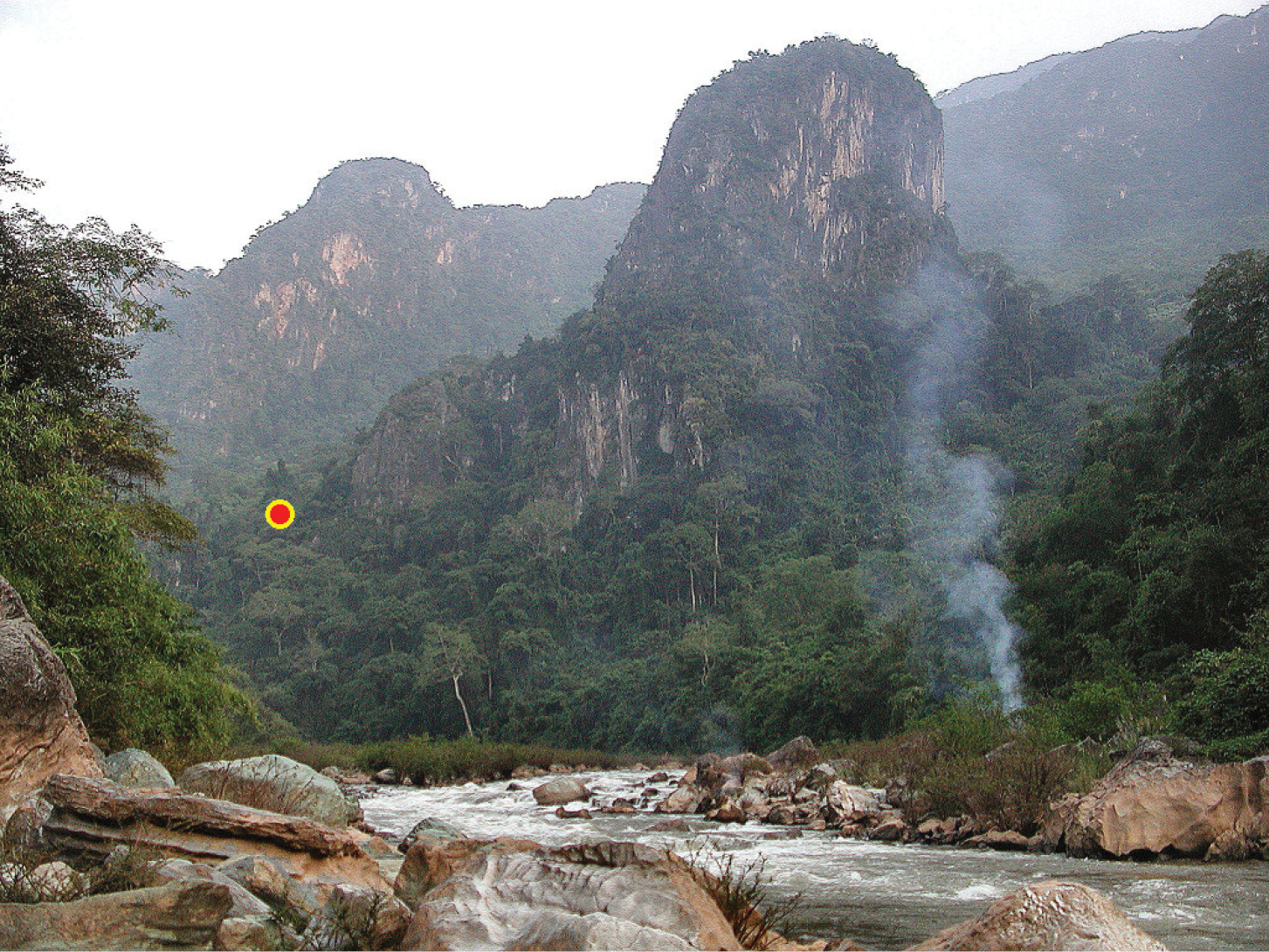
Habitat of Gudeodiscus messageri raheemi in Luang Prabang Province in Laos. Red dot indicates, where snails were collected.

It is a ground-dwelling species as all other plectopylid snails in Vietnam. It lives in primary forests and in old secondary broad-leaved forests. It can be found in the humid microenvironments under leaves, logs, limestone rocks and in black soil accumulated inside limestone pockets.

It co-occur with other plectopylids in Vietnam: with Gudeodiscus phlyarius and with Gudeodiscus hemmeni. It also co-occur with clausiliid Garnieria mouhoti, that is also associated with the moderate humidity of broad-leaved forests.
