= Sicradiscus =

Scientific classification
- Kingdom: Animalia
- Phylum: Mollusca
- Class: Gastropoda
- Order: Stylommatophora
- Family: Plectopylidae
- Subfamily: Sinicolinae
- Genus: Sicradiscus; Páll-Gergely, 2013

Genus of land snails

Sicradiscus is a genus of gastropods belonging to the family Plectopylidae.

The species of this genus are found in Eastern Asia.

Species:

- Sicradiscus cutisculptus (Möllendorff, 1882)
- Sicradiscus diptychia (Möllendorff, 1885)
- Sicradiscus feheri Páll-Gergely & Hunyadi, 2013
- Sicradiscus hirasei (Pilsbry, 1904)
- Sicradiscus invius (Heude, 1885)
- Sicradiscus ishizakii (Kuroda, 1941)
- Sicradiscus mansuyi (Gude, 1908)
- Sicradiscus schistoptychia (Möllendorff, 1886)
- Sicradiscus securus (Heude, 1889)
- Sicradiscus transitus Páll-Gergely, 2013
