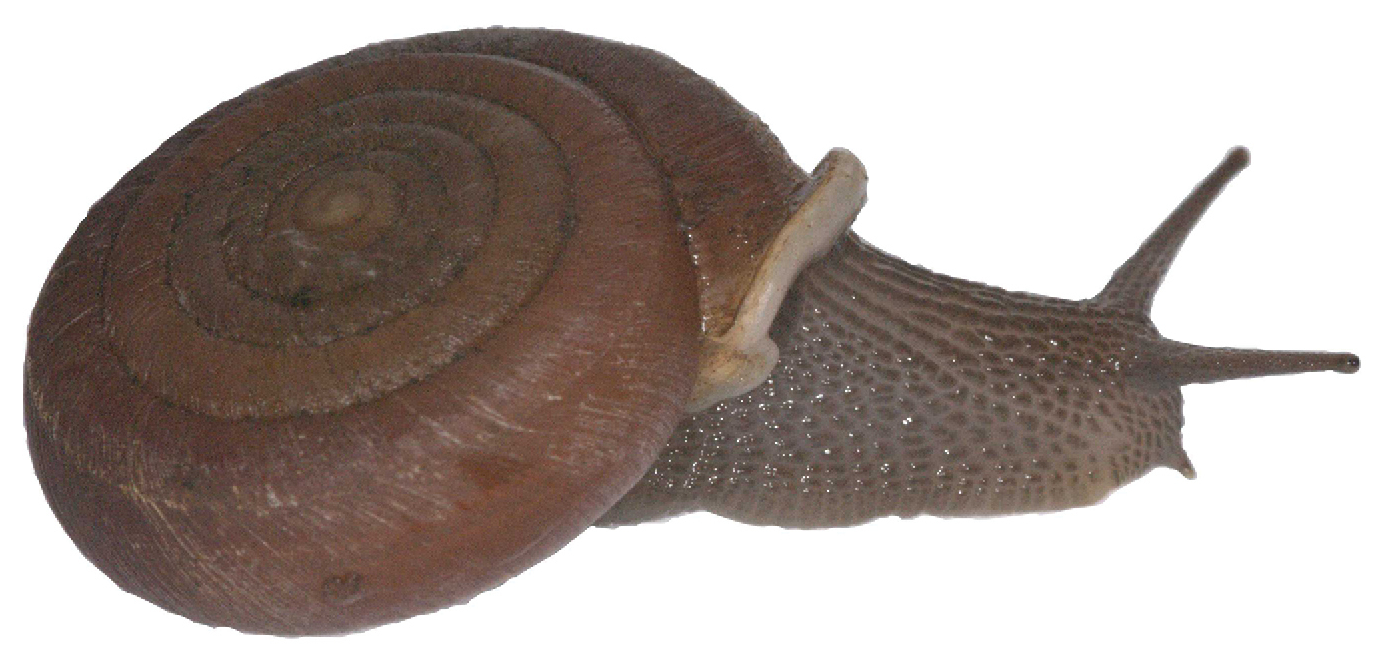
- A live Halongella schlumbergeri

Scientific classification
- Kingdom: Animalia
- Phylum: Mollusca
- Class: Gastropoda
- Order: Stylommatophora
- Family: Plectopylidae
- Subfamily: Sinicolinae
- Genus: Halongella; Páll-Gergely, 2015

Diversity
- 2 species

= Halongella =

Genus of gastropods

Halongella is a genus of air-breathing land snails, terrestrial pulmonate gastropod mollusks in the family Plectopylidae.

The generic name is derived from the Halong Bay, where these snails occur.

== Species ==
Species in the genus Plectopylis include:

- Halongella fruhstorferi (Möllendorff, 1901)
- Halongella schlumbergeri (Morlet, 1886) - type species of the genus Halongella
