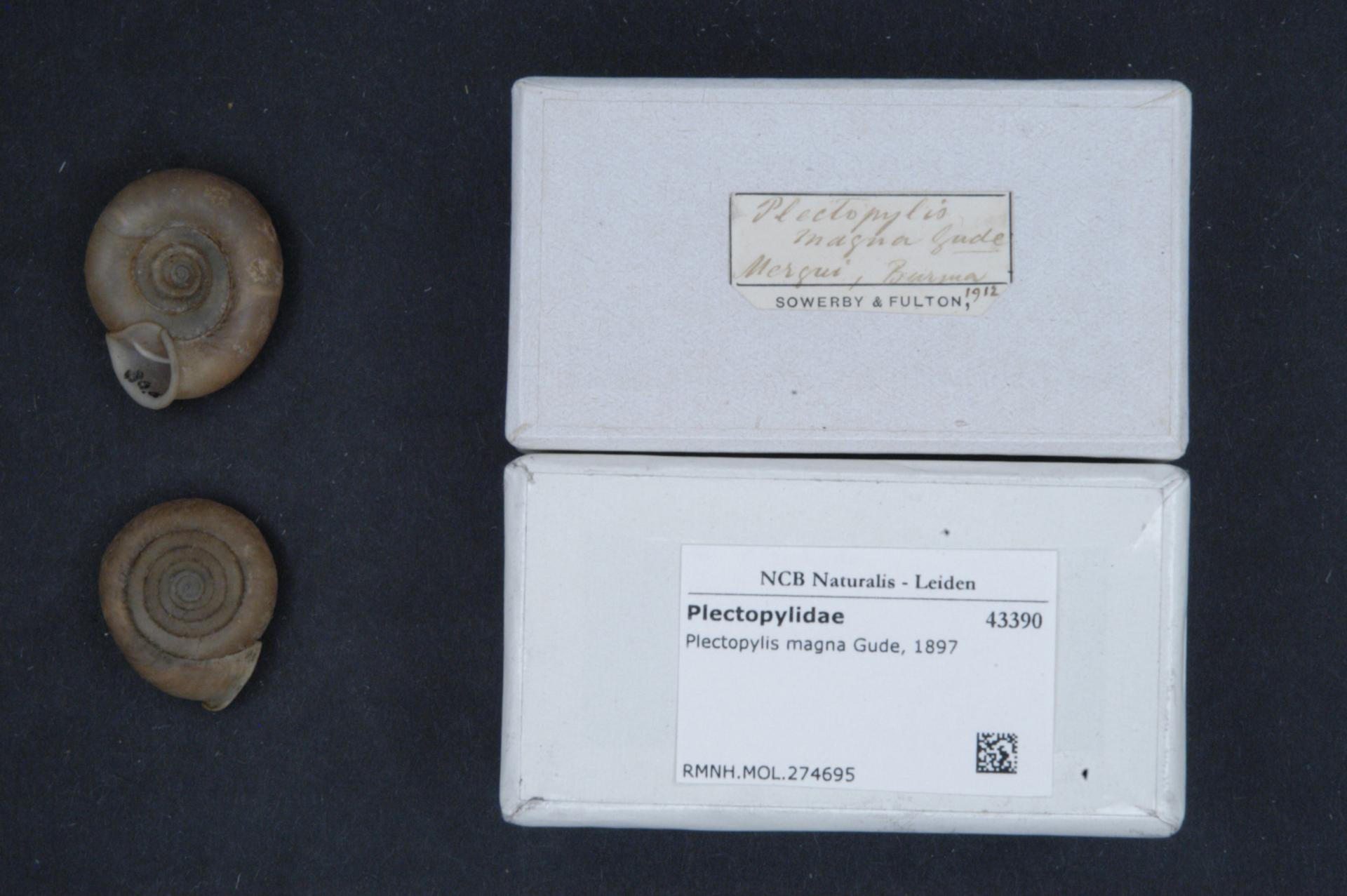
- Chersaecia magna shells

Scientific classification
- Kingdom: Animalia
- Phylum: Mollusca
- Class: Gastropoda
- Order: Stylommatophora
- Family: Plectopylidae
- Genus: Chersaecia
- Species: C. magna

Binomial name
- Chersaecia magna Gude, 1897

Synonyms
- Plectopylis lissochlamys Gude, 1897 (junior synonym); Plectopylis magna Gude, 1897 (original combination)

= Chersaecia magna =

Species of gastropod

Chersaecia magna is a species of air-breathing land snail, a terrestrial pulmonate gastropod mollusk in the family Plectopylidae.

== Distribution ==
This snail occurs in Myanmar.
