= Amphicoelina diplomphala =

Scientific classification
- Kingdom: Animalia
- Phylum: Mollusca
- Class: Gastropoda
- Order: Stylommatophora
- Family: Camaenidae
- Genus: Amphicoelina
- Species: A. diplomphala

Binomial name
- Amphicoelina diplomphala (Möllendorff, 1885)

Synonyms
- Helix (Gonostoma) diplomphala Möllendorff, 1885 (original combination)

Species of snail

Amphicoelina diplomphala is a species of air-breathing snail in the family Camaenidae.

== Description ==
The length of the shell attains 5 mm, its diameter 11 mm.

(Original description in Latin) The shell, characterized by its open umbilicus has a discoid form. It is thin, horny, and exhibits oblique striations. It is covered in rather long folds arranged in transverse series, giving it a hirsute appearance. The spire is deeply concave. The shell consists of 6.5 to 7 somewhat convex, very narrow whorls that demonstrate slow growth. The body whorl is significantly compressed laterally and shortly deflected at the aperture. The aperture is narrow and irregularly lunar in shape. The peristome is shortly expanded and slightly reflexed, with its margins connected by a very thin, arcuate callus. The outer and basal margins of the peristome are sinuous.

== Distribution ==
This species was found in the province Hubei, China.
