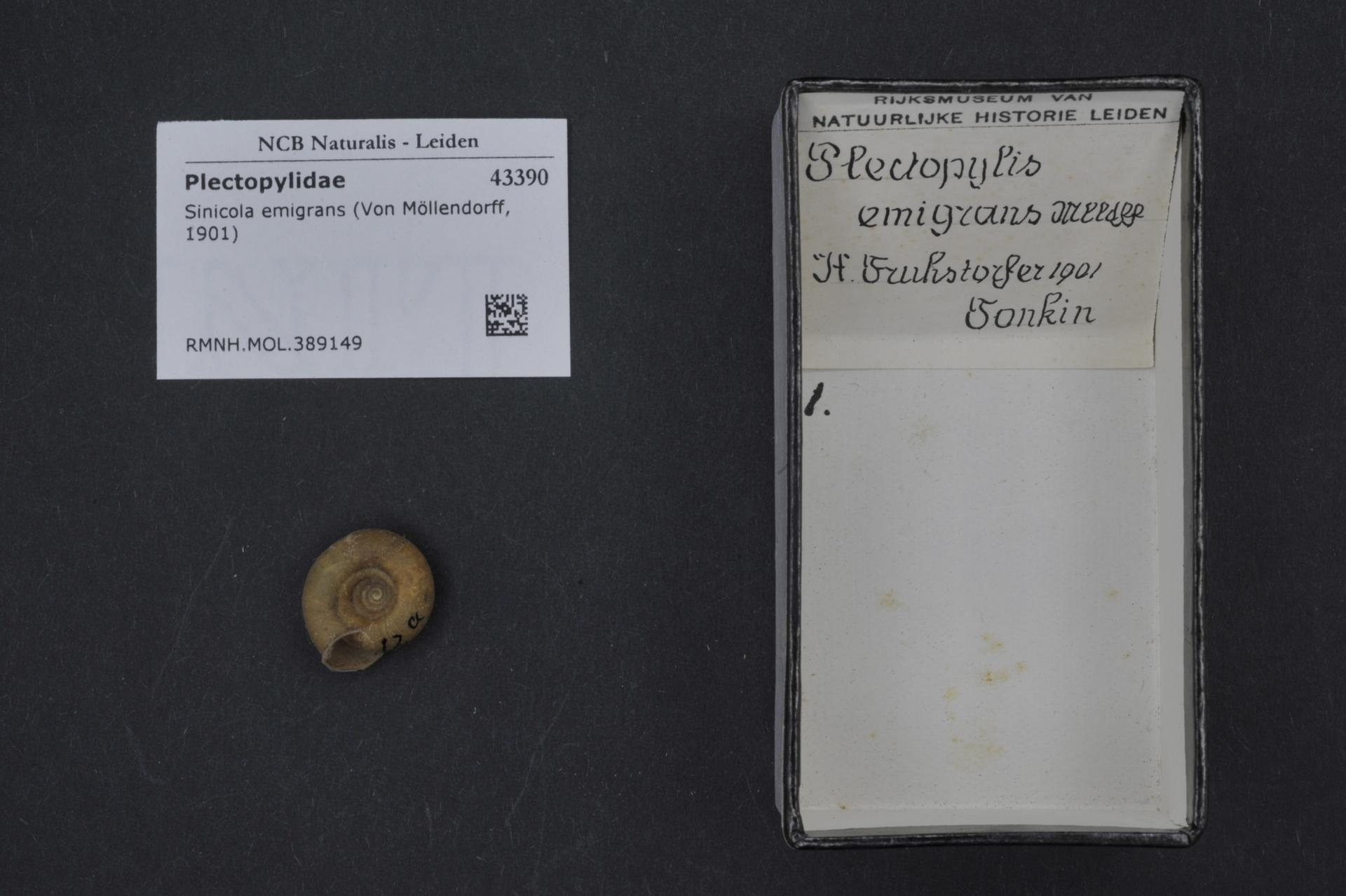
- Gudeodiscus emigrans shell

Scientific classification
- Kingdom: Animalia
- Phylum: Mollusca
- Class: Gastropoda
- Order: Stylommatophora
- Family: Plectopylidae
- Genus: Gudeodiscus
- Species: G. emigrans

Binomial name
- Gudeodiscus emigrans (Möllendorff, 1901)

Synonyms
- Plectopylis (Sinicola) emigrans Möllendorff, 1901

= Gudeodiscus emigrans =

Species of gastropod

Gudeodiscus emigrans is a species of air-breathing land snail, a terrestrial pulmonate gastropod mollusk in the family Plectopylidae.

== Subspecies ==
- Gudeodiscus emigrans emigrans (Möllendorff, 1901)
- Gudeodiscus emigrans quadrilamellatus Páll-Gergely, 2013
- Gudeodiscus emigrans otanii Páll-Gergely & Hunyadi, 2013

== Distribution ==
The distribution of Gudeodiscus emigrans was described from "Mẫu Sơn Mountains" within Lạng Sơn province, Vietnam. It also occur in Bắc Kạn province, Tuyên Quang province, and in Tam Đảo district between Thái Nguyên province and Vĩnh Phúc province.

== Ecology ==
It is a ground-dwelling species as all other plectopylid snails in Vietnam.

Gudeodiscus emigrans quadrilamellatus co-occur with other plectopylids in Vietnam: with Gudeodiscus anceyi. Gudeodiscus fischeri live at geographically close sites to Gudeodiscus emigrans quadrilamellatus.

== See also ==
- List of non-marine molluscs of Vietnam
