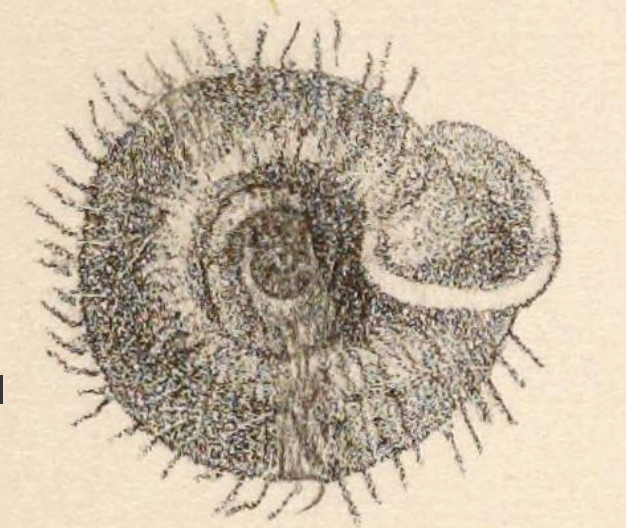
- Shell of Amphicoelina biconcava (holotype)

Scientific classification
- Kingdom: Animalia
- Phylum: Mollusca
- Class: Gastropoda
- Order: Stylommatophora
- Family: Camaenidae
- Genus: Amphicoelina
- Species: A. biconcava

Binomial name
- Amphicoelina biconcava (Heude, 1882)

Synonyms
- Helix biconcava Heude, 1882 (original combination)

= Amphicoelina biconcava =

Species of snail

Amphicoelina biconcava is a species of air-breathing snail in the family Camaenidae.

== Description ==
The length of the shell attains 4 mm, its diameter 8 mm.

(Original description in French) This umbilicate, orbicular, discoid shell features a reddish-brown epidermis covered with long, soft, obliquely striated hairs. The spire is sunken with a flat apex, comprising five convex, narrow whorls joined by a moderately deep suture. These whorls grow slowly and uniformly, maintaining a consistent size. The body whorl is strongly compressed laterally, significantly deflected at the aperture, and convex both above and below. The aperture is compressed and diagonally oblique. The peristome is slightly thickened, reflected, and sinuous at its insertions. The umbilicus is crateriform and broadly open.

== Distribution ==
This species was found on the right bank of the Han river, China.
