= Amphicoelina subobvoluta =

Scientific classification
- Kingdom: Animalia
- Phylum: Mollusca
- Class: Gastropoda
- Order: Stylommatophora
- Family: Camaenidae
- Genus: Amphicoelina
- Species: A. subobvoluta

Binomial name
- Amphicoelina subobvoluta (Ancey, 1882)

Synonyms
- Helix (Gonostoma) subobvoluta Ancey, 1882 (original combination)

Species of snail

Amphicoelina omphalospira is a species of air-breathing snail in the family Camaenidae.

== Description ==
The length of the shell attains 4 mm, its diameter 8.5 mm.

(Original description in French) In contrast to Helicodonta obvoluta (O. F. Müller, 1774), this species exhibits a smaller overall size, a comparatively larger umbilicus, a reduced number of whorls (limited to five), and an aperture that is less subangular, especially in its lower region, which is consistently rounded. Despite a general resemblance to the aforementioned species, it is readily distinguishable by the aforementioned differential features.

== Distribution ==
This species was found in central China.
