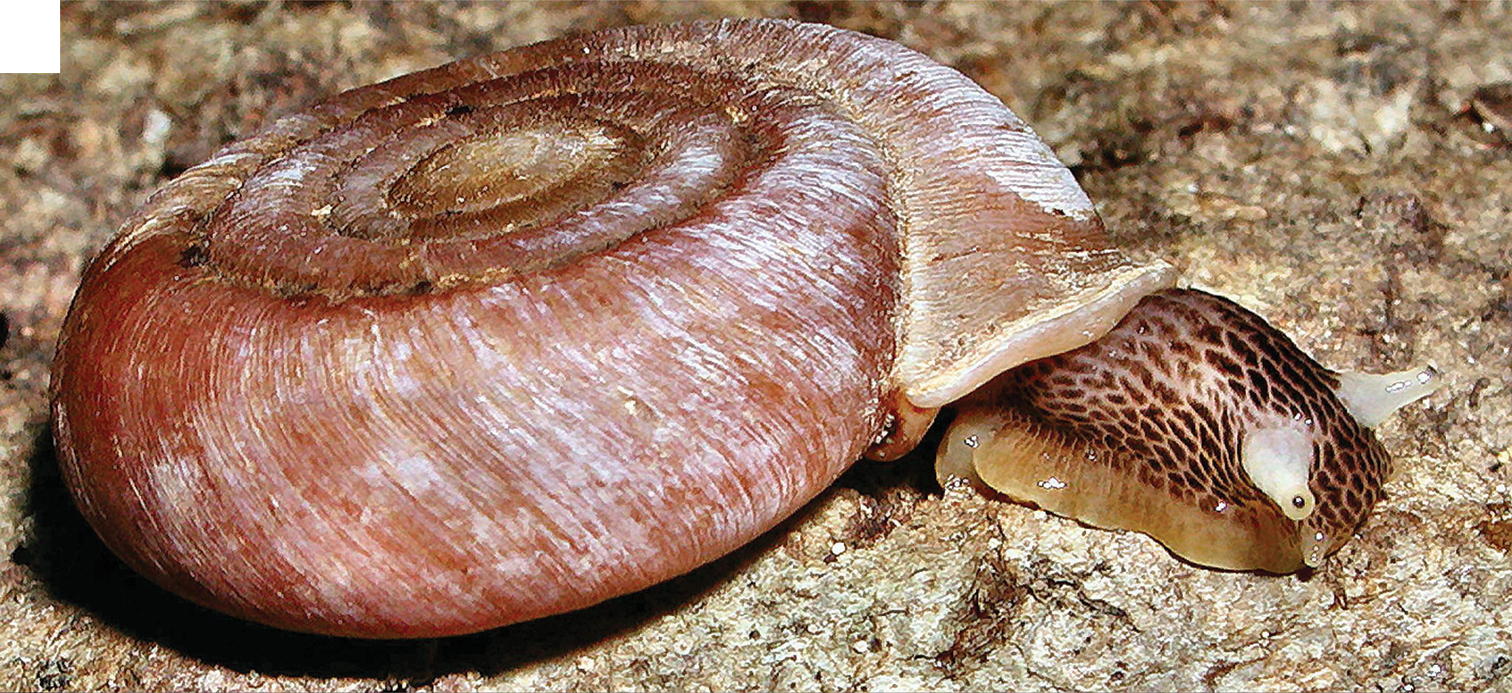

Scientific classification
- Kingdom: Animalia
- Phylum: Mollusca
- Class: Gastropoda
- Order: Stylommatophora
- Family: Plectopylidae
- Genus: Naggsia
- Species: N. laomontana

Binomial name
- Naggsia laomontana (L. Pfeiffer, 1862)

Synonyms
- Helix laomontana L. Pfeiffer, 1862; Plectopylis laomontana (L. Pfeiffer, 1862); Chersaecia laomontana (L. Pfeiffer, 1862)

= Naggsia laomontana =

Species of gastropod

Naggsia laomontana is a species of air-breathing land snail, a terrestrial pulmonate gastropod mollusc in the family Plectopylidae.

== Distribution ==
The distribution of Naggsia laomontana includes Laos.
