= Gudeodiscus hemmeni =

Scientific classification
- Kingdom: Animalia
- Phylum: Mollusca
- Class: Gastropoda
- Order: Stylommatophora
- Family: Plectopylidae
- Genus: Gudeodiscus
- Species: G. hemmeni

Binomial name
- Gudeodiscus hemmeni Páll-Gergely & Hunyadi, 2015

Species of gastropod

Gudeodiscus hemmeni is a species of air-breathing land snail, a terrestrial pulmonate gastropod mollusc in the family Plectopylidae.

The specific name hemmeni is in honor of malacologist Jens Hemmen (1944–2012). Holotype is stored in Hungarian Natural History Museum, paratypes are stored in collections of András Hunyadi and Barna Páll-Gergely.

== Distribution ==
The distribution of Gudeodiscus hemmeni includes south-eastern Sơn La Province, Vietnam. The type locality is "Sơn La Province, Hà Nội 156 km towards Mộc Châu, left side of the road nr. 6, rocky wall, 1110 m, 20°45.993′N 104°53.868′E".

== Description ==
The width of the shell is 9.5–10.1 mm. The height of the shell is 4.3–5.2 mm.

== Ecology ==
It is a ground-dwelling species as all other plectopylid snails in Vietnam. Gudeodiscus hemmeni lives sympatrically with Gudeodiscus messageri raheemi.
