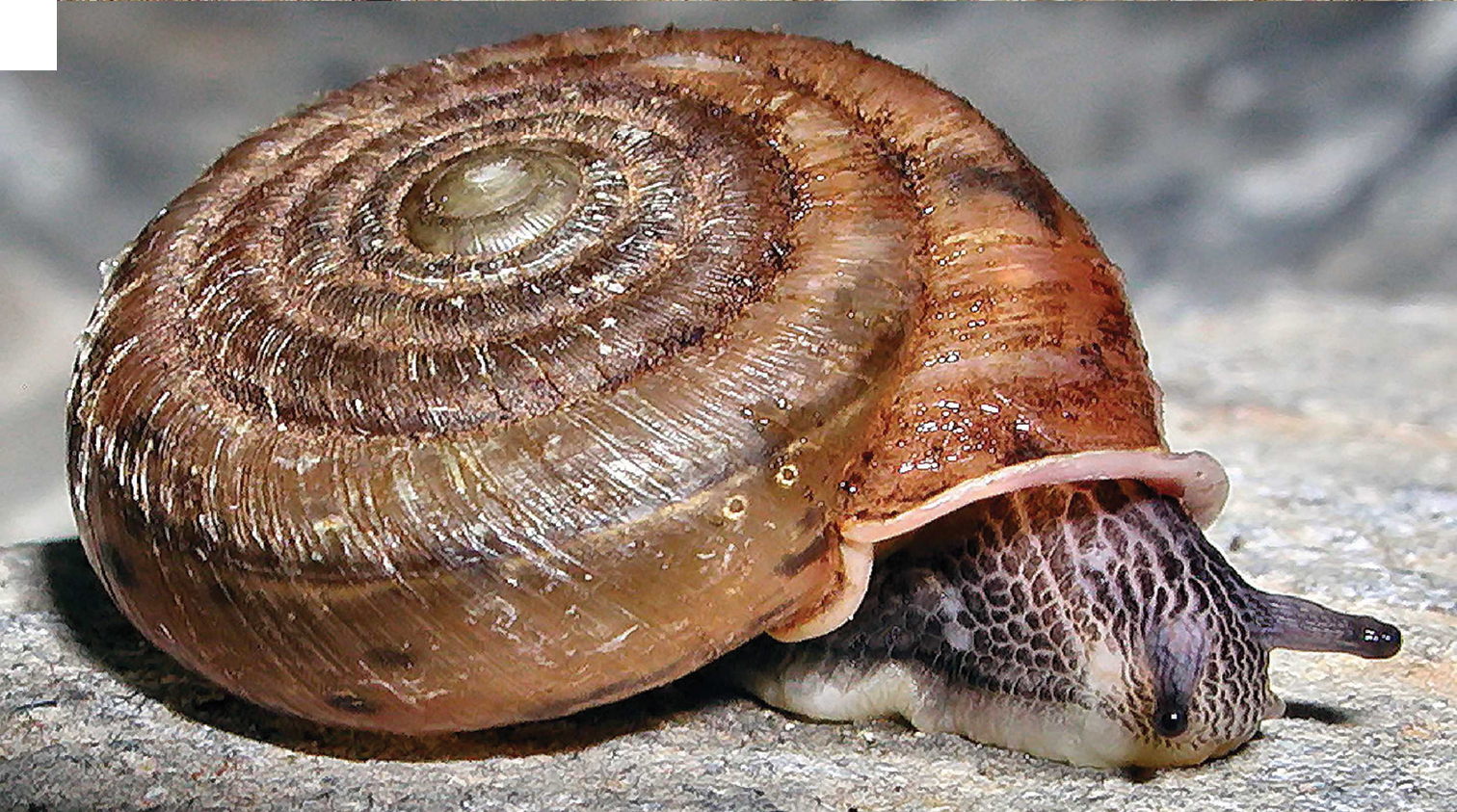
- Gudeodiscus messageri raheemi
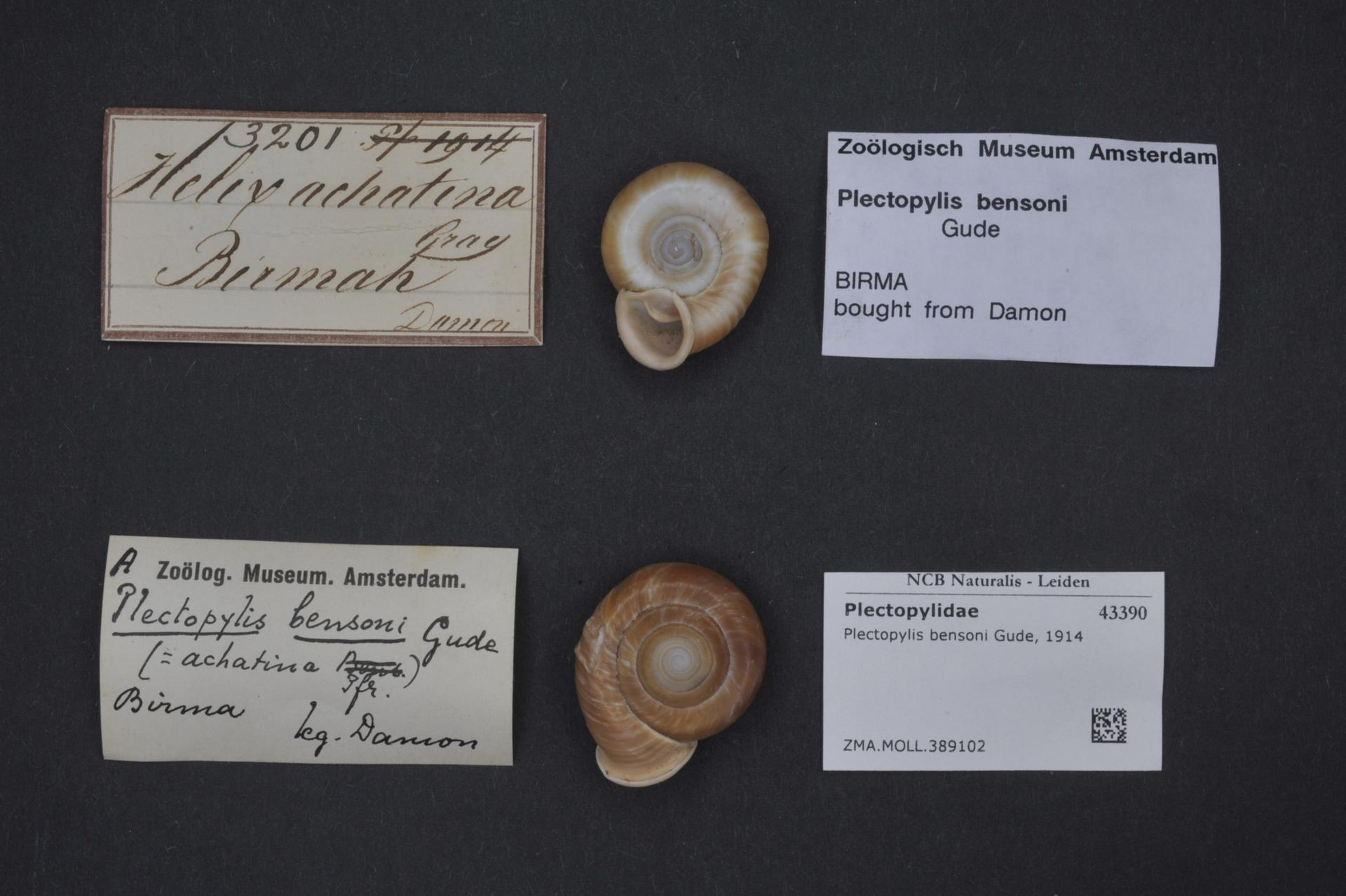
- Plectopylis bensoni shells

Scientific classification
- Kingdom: Animalia
- Phylum: Mollusca
- Class: Gastropoda
- Order: Stylommatophora
- Suborder: Helicina
- Infraorder: incertae sedis
- Superfamily: Plectopyloidea
- Family: Plectopylidae; Möllendorff, 1898

= Plectopylidae =

Family of gastropods

Plectopylidae is a taxonomic family of large air-breathing land snails, terrestrial pulmonate gastropod mollusks in the superfamily Plectopyloidea.

== Distribution ==
The range of the family Plectopylidae (Plectopylis Benson 1860 s. l.) extends from Nepal and Northeastern India through large part of Southeastern Asia (including the Malay Peninsula, Northern Thailand, Northern Vietnam, Central and Southern China) to Taiwan and Southern Japan. Up to now, the distribution of Plectopylidae is divided into two geographic regions: (1) Nepal, Northeastern India (Assam and Arunachal Pradesh), Myanmar, western Yunnan, western part of Thailand, Northern Malaysia and northwestern part of Laos, and (2) Northern Vietnam, Southern China (west of the Eastern Yunnan–Guizhou–Middle Sichuan line), Taiwan and the Ryukyu Islands.

== Taxonomy ==
This family has two subfamilies:

- Plectopylinae Möllendorff, 1898
- Sinicolinae Páll-Gergely, 2018

== Genera ==
Genera within the family Plectopylidae include:

Plectopylinae Möllendorff, 1898

- Chersaecia Gude, 1899
- Hunyadiscus Páll-Gergely, 2016
- Naggsia Páll-Gergely & Muratov, 2016
- Plectopylis Benson, 1860 - the type genus of the family Plectopylidae

Sinicolinae Páll-Gergely, 2018

- Endothyrella Zilch, 1959
- Gudeodiscus Páll-Gergely, 2013
  - subgenus Gudeodiscus Páll-Gergely, 2013
  - subgenus Veludiscus Páll-Gergely, 2015
- Halongella Páll-Gergely, 2015
- † Plectopyloides Yen, 1969 - fossil genus from China
- Sicradiscus Páll-Gergely, 2013
- Sinicola Gude, 1899

Genera brought into synonymy

- Endoplon Gude, 1899: synonym of Chersaecia Gude, 1899 (junior synonym)
- Endothyra Gude, 1899: synonym of Endothyrella Zilch, 1960

Gerard Kalshoven Gude revised every known taxon of Plectopylis at the end of the 19th century, and he published drawings of their shells and armature (lamella complex). He subdivided Plectopylis into seven “sections”: Endothyra, Chersaecia, Endoplon, Plectopylis, Sinicola, Enteroplax Gude, 1899 and Sykesia Gude, 1897. Enteroplax was transferred to the family Strobilopsidae Wenz, 1915. Ruthvenia Gude, 1911 (replacement name for Sykesia which itself was a replacement name for Austenia Gude, 1897) was transferred to the family Endodontidae Pilsbry, 1895 or to the Charopidae Hutton, 1884. The name Endothyrella was established by Zilch (1960) to replace the generic name Endothyra Gude, 1899, that is a junior homonym of foraminiferan genus Endothyra Phillips, 1845. Genus Amphicoelina Haas, 1933 was classified within Plectopylidae before, but it was moved to Camaenidae in 2013.

Gude's diagnoses of his sections are based on the direction of the coiling of the shell, the depth of the umbilicus, and the morphology and direction of the palatal folds. Most of Gude's diagnoses are not mutually exclusive. Moreover, several species were misassigned by Gude, which was probably the result of focusing exclusively on the morphology of the parietal plicae. Most of plectopylid species were reviewed and some were reassigned by Barna Páll-Gergely and his colleagues in 2013-2016.

== Overview of species ==
Species within the family Plectopylidae include:

1. Chersaecia austeni (Gude, 1899)
2. Chersaecia brachydiscus (Godwin-Austen, 1879)
3. Chersaecia degerbolae (Solem, 1966)
4. Chersaecia dextrorsa (Benson, 1860)
5. Chersaecia kengtungensis (Gude, 1914)
6. Chersaecia leiophis (Benson, 1860) - type species, synonym: Chersaecia pseudophis Godwin-Austen, 1875
7. Chersaecia munipurensis (Godwin-Austen, 1875)
8. Chersaecia muspratti (Gude, 1897)
9. Chersaecia nagaensis (Godwin-Austen, 1875)
10. Chersaecia perarcta (Blanford, 1865)
11. Chersaecia perrierae (Gude, 1897)
12. Chersaecia refuga (Gould, 1846)
13. Chersaecia shanensis (Stoliczka, 1873)
14. Chersaecia shiroiensis (Godwin-Austen, 1875)
15. Chersaecia simplex (Solem, 1966)
16. Endoplon brachyplecta (Benson, 1863) - type species
17. Endoplon smithiana (Gude, 1896)
18. Endothyrella aborensis (Gude, 1915)
19. Endothyrella affinis (Gude, 1896)
20. Endothyrella angulata Budha & Páll-Gergely, 2015
21. Endothyrella babbagei (Gude, 1915)
22. Endothyrella brahma (Godwin-Austen, 1879)
23. Endothyrella bedfordi (Gude, 1915)
24. Endothyrella blanda (Gude, 1897)
25. Endothyrella dolakhaensis Budha & Páll-Gergely, 2015
26. Endothyrella fultoni (Godwin-Austen, 1892)
27. Endothyrella gregorsoni (Gude, 1915)
28. Endothyrella inexpectata Páll-Gergely, 2015
29. Endothyrella macromphalus (W. Blanford, 1870)
30. Endothyrella minor (Godwin-Austen, 1879)
31. Endothyrella miriensis (Gude, 1915)
32. Endothyrella nepalica Budha & Páll-Gergely, 2015
33. Endothyrella oakesi (Gude, 1915)
34. Endothyrella oglei (Godwin-Austen, 1879) - synonym: Chersaecia oglei (Godwin-Austen, 1879)
35. Endothyrella pinacis (Benson, 1859) - synonym: Endothyrella pettos (von Martens, 1868)
36. Endothyrella plectostoma (Benson, 1836) - type species, subspecies: Endothyrella plectostoma prodigium (Benson); Endothyrella plectostoma exerta (Gude, 1901)
37. Endothyrella robustistriata Páll-Gergely, 2015
38. Endothyrella serica (Godwin-Austen, 1875) - synonym: Chersaecia serica (Godwin-Austen, 1875)
39. Endothyrella sowerbyi (Gude, 1898)
40. Endothyrella tricarinata (Gude, 1897)
41. Endothyrella williamsoni (Gude, 1915)
42. Gudeodiscus anceyi (Gude, 1901)
43. Gudeodiscus concavus Páll-Gergely, 2013
44. Gudeodiscus cyrtochilus (Gude, 1909)
45. Gudeodiscus dautzenbergi (Gude, 1901) - synonym: Gudeodiscus persimilis (Gude, 1901)
46. Gudeodiscus emigrans (Möllendorff, 1901) - subspecies: Gudeodiscus emigrans otanii Páll-Gergely & Hunyadi, 2013; Gudeodiscus emigrans quadrilamellatus Páll-Gergely, 2013
47. Gudeodiscus eroessi Páll-Gergely & Hunyadi, 2013 - subspecies: Gudeodiscus eroessi fuscus Páll-Gergely & Hunyadi, 2013; Gudeodiscus eroessi hemisculptus Páll-Gergely, 2013
48. Gudeodiscus fischeri (Gude, 1901) - synonym: Gudeodiscus tenuis (Gude, 1901)
49. Gudeodiscus francoisi (H. Fischer, 1899) - synonyms: Gudeodiscus lepidus (Gude, 1900); Gudeodiscus bavayi (Gude, 1901)
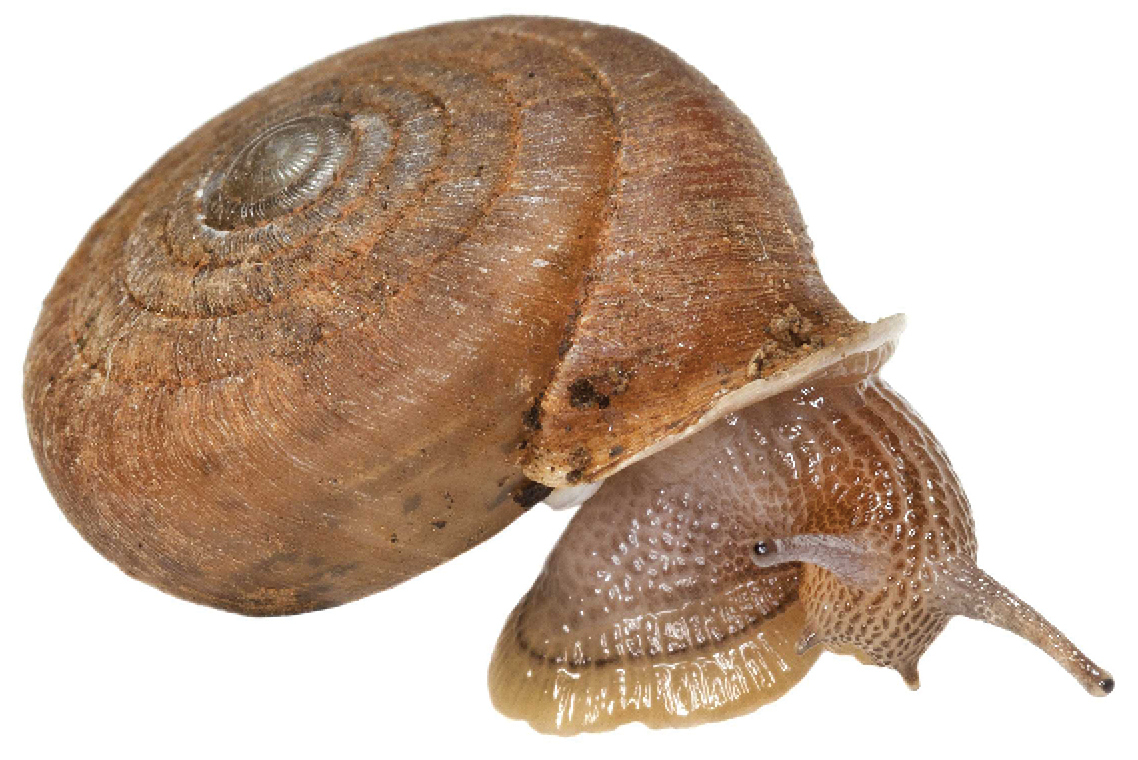
  Gudeodiscus giardi
50. Gudeodiscus giardi (H. Fischer, 1898) - synonym: Gudeodiscus congestus (Gude, 1898); subspecies: Gudeodiscus giardi szekeresi Páll-Gergely & Hunyadi, 2013; Gudeodiscus giardi oharai Páll-Gergely, 2013
51. Gudeodiscus goliath Páll-Gergely & Hunyadi, 2013
52. Gudeodiscus hemmeni Páll-Gergely & Hunyadi, 2015
53. Gudeodiscus infralevis (Gude, 1908) - synonym: Gudeodiscus soror (Gude, 1908)
54. Gudeodiscus longiplica Páll-Gergely & Asami, 2016
55. Gudeodiscus marmoreus Páll-Gergely, 2014
56. Gudeodiscus messageri (Gude, 1909) - subspecies: Gudeodiscus messageri raheemi Páll-Gergely & Hunyadi, 2015
57. Gudeodiscus multispira (Möllendorff, 1883)
58. Gudeodiscus okuboi Páll-Gergely & Hunyadi, 2013
59. Gudeodiscus phlyarius (Mabille, 1887) - type species, synonyms: Gudeodiscus moellendorffi (Gude, 1901); Gudeodiscus gouldingi (Gude, 1909); Gudeodiscus verecundus (Gude, 1909); Gudeodiscus fallax (Gude, 1909); Gudeodiscus anterides (Gude, 1909); Gudeodiscus phlyarius werneri Páll-Gergely, 2013
60. Gudeodiscus pulvinaris (Gould, 1859) - subspecies: Gudeodiscus pulvinaris robustus Páll-Gergely & Hunyadi, 2013
61. Gudeodiscus soosi Páll-Gergely, 2013
62. Gudeodiscus suprafilaris (Gude, 1908)
63. Gudeodiscus ursula Páll-Gergely & Hunyadi, 2013
64. Gudeodiscus villedaryi (Ancey, 1888)
65. Gudeodiscus yanghaoi Páll-Gergely & Hunyadi, 2013
66. Gudeodiscus yunnanensis Páll-Gergely, 2013
67. Halongella fruhstorferi (Möllendorff, 1901) - synonym: Gudeodiscus fruhstorferi (Möllendorff, 1901)
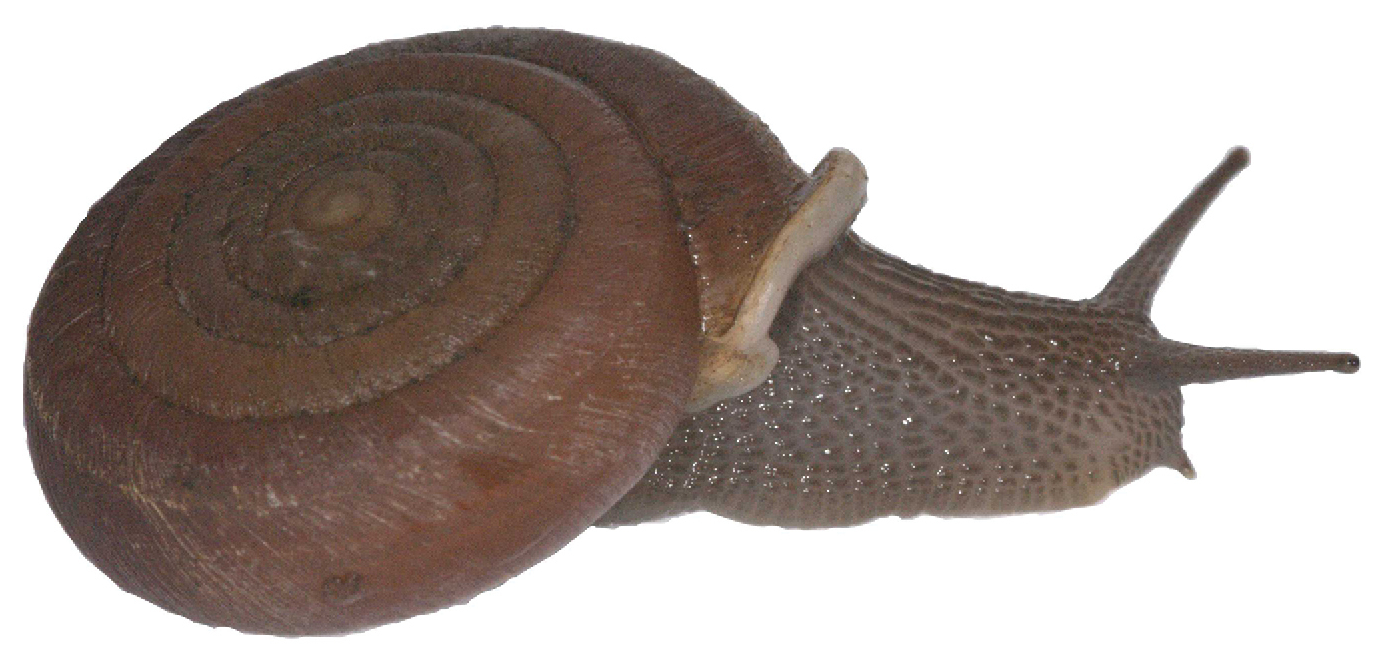
  Halongella schlumbergeri
68. Halongella schlumbergeri (Morlet, 1886) - type species, synonym: Gudeodiscus schlumbergeri (Morlet, 1886); Gudeodiscus jovius (Mabille, 1887); Gudeodiscus hirsutus (Möllendorff, 1901); Gudeodiscus pilsbryana (Gude, 1901)
69. Hunyadiscus andersoni (W. Blanford, 1869) - synonym: Chersaecia andersoni (W. Blanford, 1869)
70. Hunyadiscus saurini Páll-Gergely, 2016
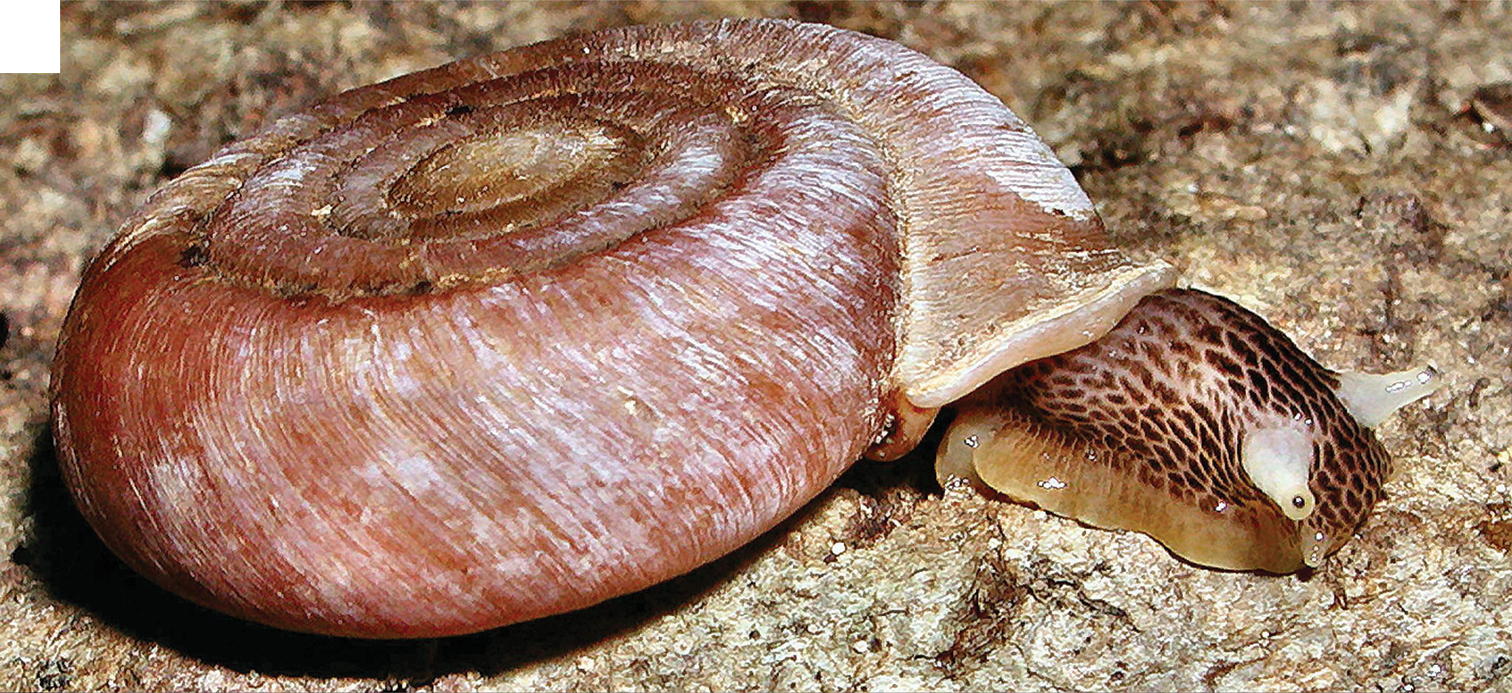
  Naggsia laomontana
71. Naggsia laomontana (L. Pfeiffer, 1862) - synonym: Chersaecia laomontana (L. Pfeiffer, 1862)
72. Plectopylis bensoni (Gude, 1914) - type species
73. Plectopylis anguina (Gould, 1847)
74. Plectopylis cairnsi (Gude, 1898)
75. Plectopylis cyclaspis (Benson, 1859) - synonym: Plectopylis revoluta Pfeiffer, 1867
76. Plectopylis feddeni (W. Blanford, 1865)
77. Plectopylis karenorum (W. Blanford, 1865)
78. Plectopylis goniobathmos (Ehrmann, 1922)
79. Plectopylis leucochila (Gude, 1897)
80. Plectopylis linterae (Möllendorff, 1897)
81. Plectopylis lissochlamys (Gude, 1897)
82. Plectopylis magna (Gude, 1897)
83. Plectopylis ponsonbyi (Godwin-Austen, 1888)
84. Plectopylis repercussa (Gould, 1856)
85. Plectopylis woodthorpei (Gude, 1899)
86. Sicradiscus cutisculptus (Möllendorff, 1882)
87. Sicradiscus diptychia (Möllendorff, 1885)
88. Sicradiscus feheri Páll-Gergely & Hunyadi, 2013
89. Sicradiscus hirasei (Pilsbry, 1904)
90. Sicradiscus invius (Heude, 1885)
91. Sicradiscus ishizakii (Kuroda, 1941)
92. Sicradiscus mansuyi (Gude, 1908)
93. Sicradiscus schistoptychia (Möllendorff, 1886) - type species
94. Sicradiscus securus (Heude, 1885)
95. Sicradiscus transitus Páll-Gergely, 2013
96. Sinicola asamiana Páll-Gergely, 2013
97. Sinicola alphonsi (Deshayes, 1870)
98. Sinicola biforis (Heude, 1885)
99. Sinicola emoriens (Gredler, 1881)
100. Sinicola fimbriosa (Martens, 1875) - type species
101. Sinicola jugatoria (Ancey, 1885) - synonym: Sinicola laminifera (Möllendorff, 1885)
102. Sinicola murata (Heude, 1885)
103. Sinicola reserata (Heude, 1885) - subspecies: Sinicola reserata azona (Gredler, 1887); Sinicola reserata hensanensis (Yen, 1939)
104. Sinicola schmackeri Páll-Gergely, 2013
105. Sinicola stenochila (Möllendorff, 1885) - subspecies: Sinicola stenochila basilia (Gude, 1897)
106. Sinicola stenomphala Páll-Gergely & Hunyadi, 2013
107. Sinicola straeleni (Yen, 1937)
108. Sinicola vallata (Heude, 1889)
109. Sinicola vargabalinti Páll-Gergely, 2014
- Endothyrella hanleyi (Godwin-Austen, 1879) - nomen dubium

Fossil species:

1. † Plectopyloides altus
2. † Plectopyloides applanatus
3. † Plectopyloides guanzhuangensis
4. † Plectopyloides multispiralus
5. † Plectopyloides regularus - type species of the genus Plectopyloides
6. † Plectopyloides shantungensis Yen, 1969

== Ecology ==
Plectopylid species seem to be associated with calcareous areas in Vietnam. Living specimens occur at the base of large limestone rocks surrounded by leaf litter and humus. Thus, they are not rock-dwelling but ground-dwelling. Most living species have reticulated sculpture on the dorsal shell side, which is often covered with soil and this may be of value in providing camouflage.
