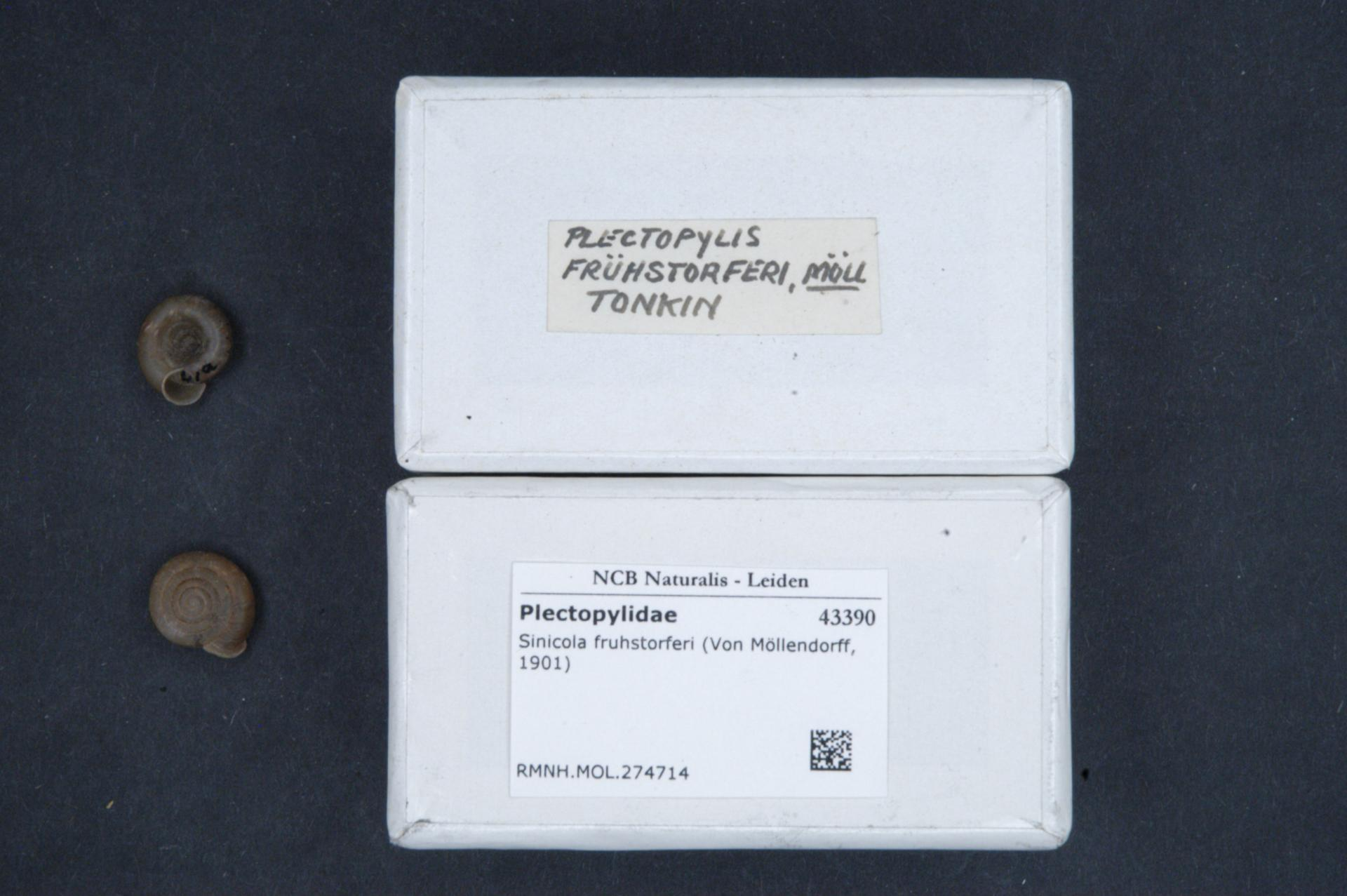
- Halongella fruhstorferi shells

Scientific classification
- Kingdom: Animalia
- Phylum: Mollusca
- Class: Gastropoda
- Order: Stylommatophora
- Family: Plectopylidae
- Genus: Halongella
- Species: H. fruhstorferi

Binomial name
- Halongella fruhstorferi (Möllendorff, 1901)

Synonyms
- Plectopylis (Sinicola) fruhstorferi Möllendorff, 1901; Gudeodiscus fruhstorferi (Möllendorff, 1901)

= Halongella fruhstorferi =

Species of gastropod

Halongella fruhstorferi is a species of air-breathing land snail, a terrestrial pulmonate gastropod mollusk in the family Plectopylidae.

== Distribution ==
The distribution of Halongella fruhstorferi includes only Kebao Island/Vân Đồn Island in Hạ Long Bay area in Quảng Ninh Province, Vietnam.

== Ecology ==
It is a ground-dwelling species as all other plectopylid snails in Vietnam.
