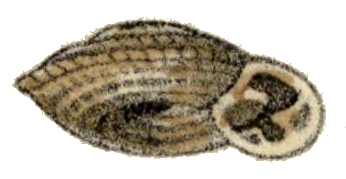
- Drawing of the apertural view of a shell of Sculptaria sculpturata

Scientific classification
- Kingdom: Animalia
- Phylum: Mollusca
- Class: Gastropoda
- Order: Stylommatophora
- Superfamily: Plectopyloidea
- Family: Sculptariidae; Degner, 1923
- Genus: Sculptaria; L. Pfeiffer, 1855

Diversity
- About 15 species

= Sculptaria =

Genus of gastropods

Sculptaria is a genus of small air-breathing land snails, and terrestrial pulmonate gastropod molluscs in the superfamily Plectopyloidea.

Sculptaria is the only genus in the family Sculptariidae. This family has no subfamilies (according to the taxonomy of the Gastropoda by Bouchet & Rocroi, 2005).

== Distribution ==
The distribution of Sculptaria includes south-western Africa.

== Description ==
The shell is small, discoidal, carinated, widely umbilicated. The last whorl is becoming free at the aperture. The aperture is very oblique, rounded, with continuous slightly expanded peristome, and having several teeth on the outer lip and an entering parietal lamina.

== Genera ==
Species within the genus Sculptaria include:

- Sculptaria chapmanni Ancey, 1890
- Sculptaria damarensis H. Adams, 1870
  - Sculptaria damarensis damarensis H. Adams
  - Sculptaria damarensis minor Degner
  - Sculptaria damarensis pygmaea Zilch 1952
- Sculptaria edlingeri Connolly, 1938
  - Sculptaria edlingeri edlingeri Connolly, 1938
  - Sculptaria edlingeri plurilamellata Blume, 1952
- Sculptaria framesi Burnup, 1923
- Sculptaria fumarium van Bruggen & Rolán, 2003 - from Namibia
- Sculptaria gertenbachae Blume, 1963
- Sculptaria hoeschae Zilch, 1951
- Sculptaria kaokoensis Zilch 1952 - from Namibia
- Sculptaria leschkei Degner, 1922
- Sculptaria namaquensis Zilch, 1939 - from Namibia
- Sculptaria ohopohoensis Zilch, 1939
- Sculptaria planula Zilch, 1951
- Sculptaria pretiosa Zilch, 1939
- Sculptaria retisculpta v. Martens, 1889
- Sculptaria sculpturata (Gray, 1838) - type species
  - Sculptaria sculpturata collaris Pfeiffer, 1867 / Sculptaria collaris - from southern Angola. The width of the shell is 6.4 mm. The height of the shell is 2 mm. The shell has 4.3 whorls. - drawing of the anatomy
  - Sculptaria sculpturata collaris Pfeiffer, 1867
  - Sculptaria sculpturata laevis Zilch 1939
