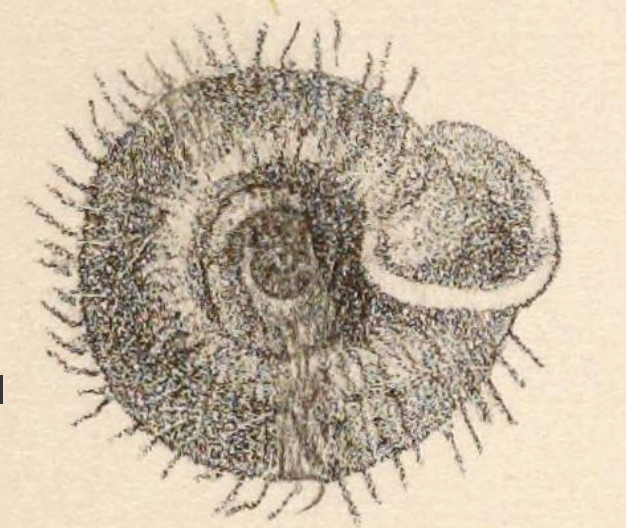
- = drawing of a shell of Amphicoelina biconcava

Scientific classification
- Kingdom: Animalia
- Phylum: Mollusca
- Class: Gastropoda
- Order: Stylommatophora
- Family: Camaenidae
- Subfamily: Camaeninae
- Genus: Amphicoelina; Zilch, 1960

Type species
- Helix biconcava Heude, 1882

Synonyms
- Amphicoelina Haas, 1933 (Not available (no diagnosis) from Haas, 1933)

= Amphicoelina =

Genus of gastropods

Amphicoelina is a genus of air-breathing land snails, terrestrial pulmonate gastropod mollusks in the subfamily Camaeninae of the family Camaenidae.

Previously to 2014 this genus was classified under the family Plectopylidae.

== Distribution ==
Distribution of the genus Amphicoelina includes Hunan and Hubei provinces in southern China.

== Species ==
Species within the genus Amphicoelina include:

- Amphicoelina biconcava (Heude, 1882) - type species of the genus Amphicoelina
- Amphicoelina diplomphala (Möllendorff, 1885)
- Amphicoelina omphalospira (Möllendorff, 1897)
- Amphicoelina subobvoluta (Ancey, 1882)
