= Gudeodiscus francoisi =

Scientific classification
- Kingdom: Animalia
- Phylum: Mollusca
- Class: Gastropoda
- Order: Stylommatophora
- Family: Plectopylidae
- Genus: Gudeodiscus
- Species: G. francoisi

Binomial name
- Gudeodiscus francoisi (H. Fischer, 1898)

Synonyms
- Plectopylis Françoisi Fischer, 1898; Plectopylis francoisi Fischer, 1898; Plectopylis lepida Gude, 1900; Gudeodiscus lepidus (Gude, 1900); Plectopylis Bavayi Gude, 1901; Gudeodiscus bavayi (Gude, 1901)

Species of gastropod

Gudeodiscus francoisi is a species of air-breathing land snail, a terrestrial pulmonate gastropod mollusk in the family Plectopylidae.

This species was described by French zoologist Pierre Marie Henri Fischer (1865-1916) (son of Paul Henri Fischer) in 1898.

== Distribution ==
The distribution of Gudeodiscus francoisi includes Vietnam.

== Ecology ==
It is a ground-dwelling species as all other plectopylid snails in Vietnam.

It co-occur with other plectopylids in Vietnam: with Gudeodiscus anceyi, Gudeodiscus giardi. Gudeodiscus phlyarius and Gudeodiscus suprafilaris live at geographically close sites to Gudeodiscus francoisi.
