= Amphicoelina omphalospira =

Scientific classification
- Kingdom: Animalia
- Phylum: Mollusca
- Class: Gastropoda
- Order: Stylommatophora
- Family: Camaenidae
- Genus: Amphicoelina
- Species: A. omphalospira

Binomial name
- Amphicoelina omphalospira (Möllendorff, 1897)

Synonyms
- Gonostoma (Drepanostoma) omphalospira Möllendorff, 1897 (original description)

Species of snail

Amphicoelina omphalospira is a species of air-breathing snail in the family Camaenidae.

== Description ==
The length of the shell attains 5.5 mm, its diameter 10.5 mm.

(Original description in Latin) The shell, characterized by a broad, open, and deep umbilicus, is discoid and relatively thin. Its surface exhibits fine transverse striations, an opaque and frosted texture, and is covered with short, deciduous bristles set in subregularly arranged impressed points. The coloration is brownish-tawny. The spire is deeply recessed, effectively immersed within the umbilicus. The shell comprises seven tightly coiled whorls that grow at an exceedingly slow rate. The body whorl is markedly compressed laterally, presents obtuse angles above and below, a slight convexity in the middle, a subtle anterior ascent, and a substantial subsequent descent. The aperture is moderately oblique, narrow, and inversely auriform. The peristome is moderately expanded, only slightly reflexed, and possesses a hepatic lip.

== Distribution ==
This species was found in the province Hubei, China.
