= Gudeodiscus dautzenbergi =

Scientific classification
- Kingdom: Animalia
- Phylum: Mollusca
- Class: Gastropoda
- Order: Stylommatophora
- Family: Plectopylidae
- Genus: Gudeodiscus
- Species: G. dautzenbergi

Binomial name
- Gudeodiscus dautzenbergi (Gude, 1901)

Synonyms
- Plectopylis Dautzenbergi Gude, 1901; Plectopylis persimilis Gude, 1901; Gudeodiscus persimilis (Gude, 1901)

Species of gastropod

Gudeodiscus dautzenbergi is a species of air-breathing land snail, a terrestrial pulmonate gastropod mollusk in the family Plectopylidae.

== Etymology ==
The specific name is in honour of Belgian malacologist Philippe Dautzenberg.

== Distribution ==
The distribution of Gudeodiscus dautzenbergi includes Vietnam.

== Ecology ==
It is a ground-dwelling species as all other plectopylid snails in Vietnam.

Gudeodiscus phlyarius live at geographically close sites to Gudeodiscus dautzenbergi.
