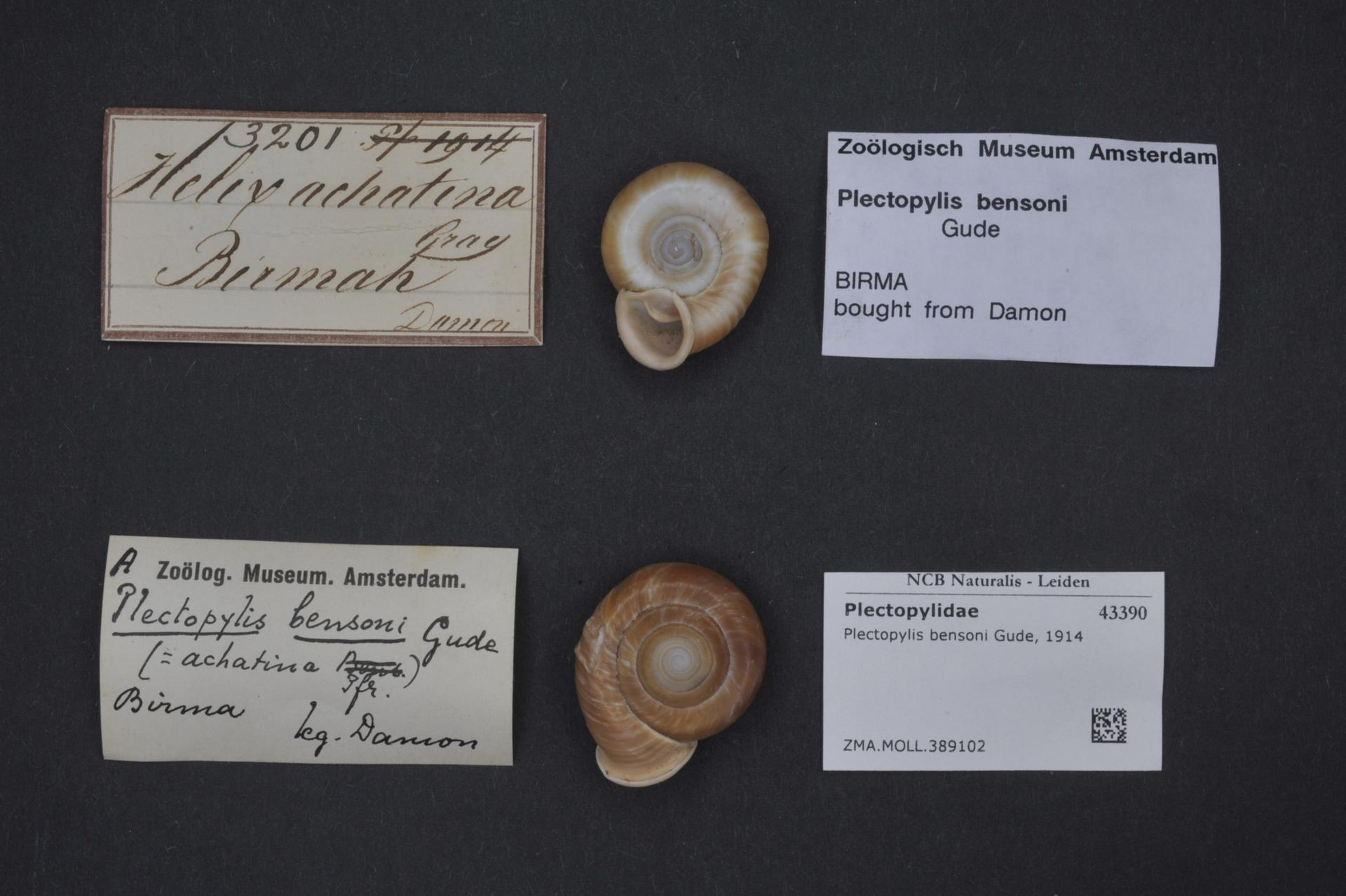
- Plectopylis bensoni shells

Scientific classification
- Kingdom: Animalia
- Phylum: Mollusca
- Class: Gastropoda
- Order: Stylommatophora
- Family: Plectopylidae
- Genus: Plectopylis
- Species: P. repercussa

Binomial name
- Plectopylis repercussa (Gould, 1856)

Synonyms
- Helix achatina L. Pfeiffer, 1845; Helix repercussa Gould, 1856 (original combination); Plectopylis (Plectopylis) bensoni Gude, 1914

= Plectopylis repercussa =

Species of gastropod

Plectopylis repercussa is a species of air-breathing land snail, a terrestrial pulmonate gastropod mollusc in the family Plectopylidae.

Plectopylis bensoni is the type species of the genus Plectopylis. The specific name bensoni is in honour of malacologist William Henry Benson.

== Distribution ==
This snail occurs in Myanmar.
