= Gudeodiscus =

Scientific classification
- Kingdom: Animalia
- Phylum: Mollusca
- Class: Gastropoda
- Order: Stylommatophora
- Family: Plectopylidae
- Genus: Gudeodiscus; Páll-Gergely, 2013

Genus of land snails

Gudeodiscus is a genus of gastropods belonging to the family Plectopylidae.

The species of this genus are found in Southeastern Asia.

Species:

- Gudeodiscus anceyi (Gude, 1901)
- Gudeodiscus concavus Páll-Gergely, 2013
- Gudeodiscus cyrtochilus (Gude, 1909)
- Gudeodiscus dautzenbergi (Gude, 1901)
- Gudeodiscus emigrans (Möllendorff, 1901)
- Gudeodiscus eroessi Páll-Gergely & Hunyadi, 2013
- Gudeodiscus fischeri (Gude, 1901)
- Gudeodiscus francoisi (H.Fischer, 1899)
- Gudeodiscus franzhuberi Thach, 2020
- Gudeodiscus fuscus Páll-Gergely & Hunyadi, 2013
- Gudeodiscus giardi (H.Fischer, 1898)
- Gudeodiscus goliath Páll-Gergely & Hunyadi, 2013
- Gudeodiscus hemisculptus Páll-Gergely, 2013
- Gudeodiscus hemmeni Páll-Gergely & Hunyadi, 2015
- Gudeodiscus infralevis (Gude, 1908)
- Gudeodiscus longiplica Páll-Gergely & Asami, 2016
- Gudeodiscus marmoreus Páll-Gergely, 2014
- Gudeodiscus messageri (Gude, 1909)
- Gudeodiscus multispira (Möllendorff, 1883)
- Gudeodiscus oharai Páll-Gergely, 2013
- Gudeodiscus okuboi Páll-Gergely & Hunyadi, 2013
- Gudeodiscus otanii Páll-Gergely, 2013
- Gudeodiscus phlyarius (J.Mabille, 1887)
- Gudeodiscus pulvinaris (Gould, 1859)
- Gudeodiscus quadrilamellatus Páll-Gergely, 2013
- Gudeodiscus robustus Páll-Gergely & Hunyadi, 2013
- Gudeodiscus soosi Páll-Gergely, 2013
- Gudeodiscus suprafilaris (Gude, 1908)
- Gudeodiscus szekeresi Páll-Gergely & Hunyadi, 2013
- Gudeodiscus ursula Páll-Gergely & Hunyadi, 2013
- Gudeodiscus villedaryi (Ancey, 1888)
- Gudeodiscus werneri Páll-Gergely, 2013
- Gudeodiscus yanghaoi Páll-Gergely & Hunyadi, 2013
- Gudeodiscus yunnanensis Páll-Gergely, 2013
