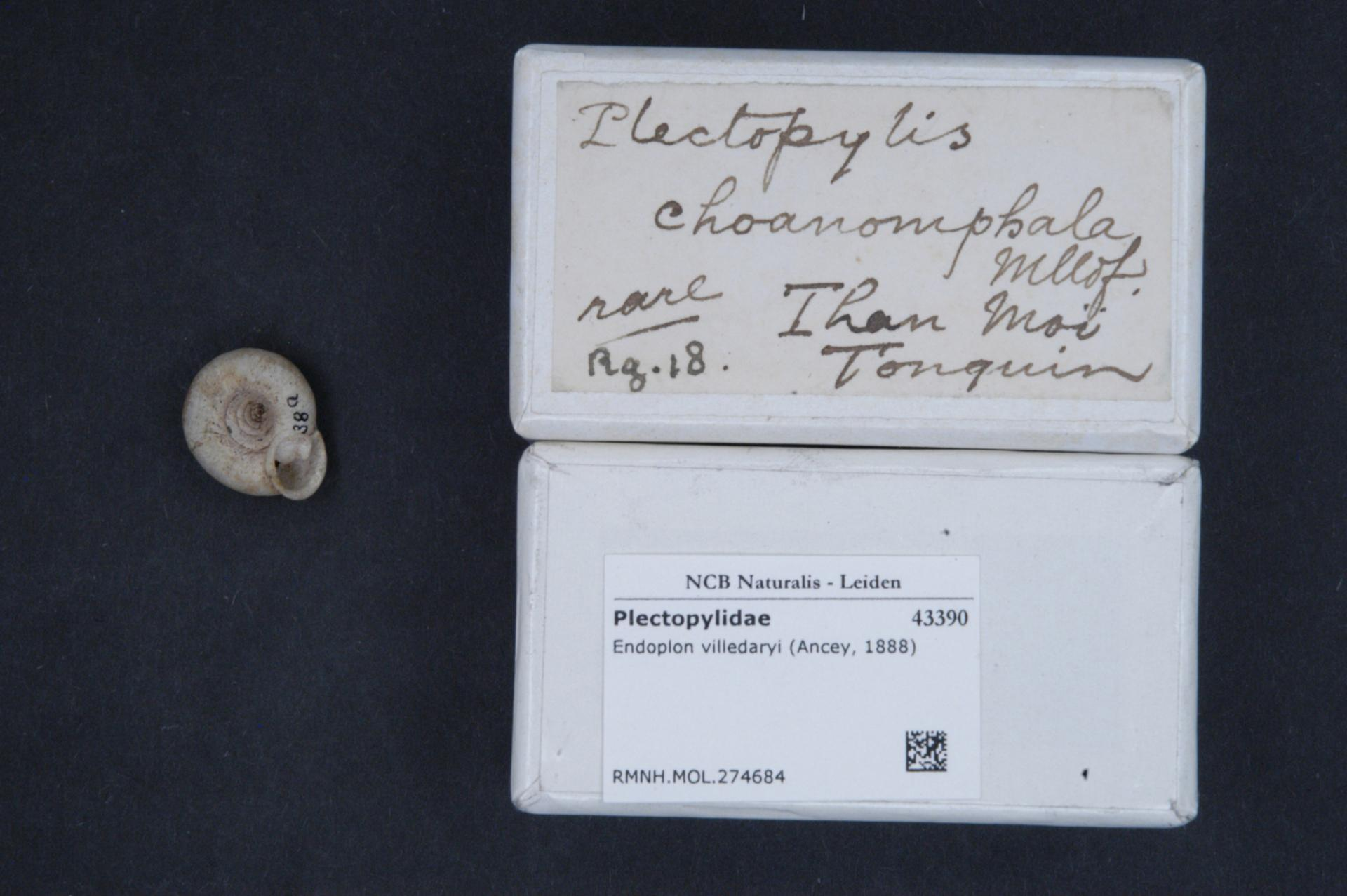
- Gudeodiscus villedaryi shell

Scientific classification
- Kingdom: Animalia
- Phylum: Mollusca
- Class: Gastropoda
- Order: Stylommatophora
- Family: Plectopylidae
- Genus: Gudeodiscus
- Species: G. villedaryi

Binomial name
- Gudeodiscus villedaryi (Ancey, 1888)

Synonyms
- Plectopylis villedaryi Ancey, 1888; Endoplon villedaryi (Ancey, 1888); Plectopylis (Endoplon) choanomphala Möllendorff, 1901

= Gudeodiscus villedaryi =

Species of gastropod

Gudeodiscus villedaryi is a species of air-breathing land snail, a terrestrial pulmonate gastropod mollusk in the family Plectopylidae.

== Distribution ==
The distribution of Gudeodiscus villedaryi includes Thái Nguyên Province and Lạng Sơn Province in Vietnam.

The type locality is Lạng Sơn Province and Bắc Ninh Province (in French original: "Région de Lang-son et de Bac-ninh").

== Ecology ==
It is a ground-dwelling species as all other plectopylid snails in Vietnam.

It co-occurs with other plectopylids in Vietnam: with Gudeodiscus anceyi and with Gudeodiscus phlyarius.
