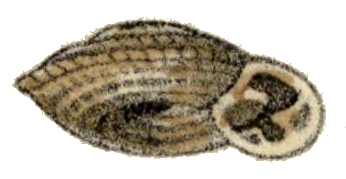
- Drawing of apertural view of the shell of Sculptaria sculpturata, family Sculptariidae

Scientific classification
- Kingdom: Animalia
- Phylum: Mollusca
- Class: Gastropoda
- Order: Stylommatophora
- Suborder: Helicina
- Infraorder: incertae sedis
- Superfamily: Plectopyloidea; Möllendorff, 1898

= Plectopyloidea =

Superfamily of gastropods

Plectopyloidea is a superfamily of air-breathing land snails, terrestrial pulmonate gastropod molluscs in the suborder Helicina.

== Families ==
The superfamily Plectopyloidea consists of the following families (according to the taxonomy of the Gastropoda by Bouchet & Rocroi, 2005):

- Family Plectopylidae Möllendorff, 1898
- Family Corillidae Pilsbry, 1905 - with only one genus Corilla
- Family Sculptariidae Degner, 1923 - with only one genus Sculptaria

== Distribution ==
Plectopylidae ranges across large parts of southeast Asia from Nepal to southern Japan. Corillidae is the mainly Sri Lankan family. Sculptariidae is the African family.

== Description ==
The Plectopylidae differ from the Corillidae by the presence of one or two vertical (= perpendicular to the suture) lamellae on the parietal wall, approximately a quarter to a half whorl behind the aperture. In contrast, the Corillidae have only horizontal (= parallel with the suture) parietal plicae (in Corilla all plicae may be absent).
