= Gerard Pierre Laurent Kalshoven Gude =

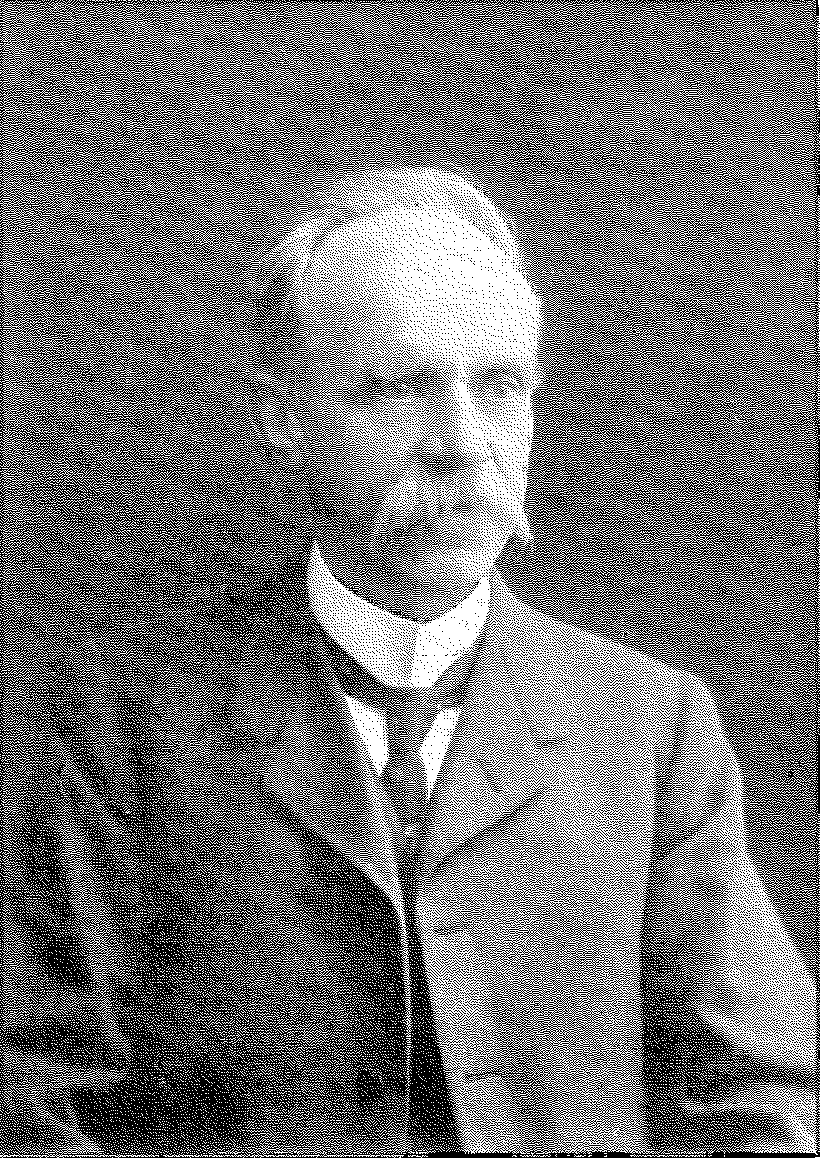
Gerard Pierre Laurent Kalshoven Gude

Gerard Pierre Laurent Kalshoven Gude (1858 in Amsterdam – 8 November 1924) was a British malacologist.

He joined the Conchological Society of Great Britain in 1890. He was elected as a fellow of the Zoological Society of London in 1884.

== Bibliography ==
He published malacological works since 1893.

Among his works belongs two volumes of The Fauna of British India, Including Ceylon and Burma.

- Gude G. K. (1896). Armature of helicoid landshells. Science-Gossip Science-Gossip 29(23): 88-92, 126-128, 154-156, 178-181, 204-207, 244-246, 274-276, 300-302, 10-11, 36-37, 70-71, 102-103, 138-139, 170-171, 231-232, 263-264, 284-285, 15-17, 74-76, 114-115, 133-134, 170-172, 239-240, 332-333, 15-17, 75-77, 147-149, 174-177. - description of Plectopylis - type genus of Plectopylidae
- Gude G. K. (1900). "Further notes on helicoid land shells from Japan, the Loo-Choo, and Bonin Islands, with descriptions of seven new species". Proceedings of the Malacological Society of London 4: 70-80.
- Gude G. K. (1914). Mollusca.−II. (Trochomorphidae--Janellidae)''.The Fauna of British India, Including Ceylon and Burma, London, xii + 520 pp., 164 figs. Edited by Arthur Everett Shipley (1861–1927) and Guy Anstruther Knox Marshall (1871–1959).
- Gude G. K. (1921). Mollusca.−III. Land operculates (Cyclophoridae, Truncatellidae, Assimineidae, Helicinidae).The Fauna of British India, Including Ceylon and Burma, London, 386 pp. Edited by Arthur Everett Shipley (1861–1927) and Guy Anstruther Knox Marshall (1871–1959).

== Eponymous taxa ==
Taxa named in honour of G. K. Gude include:

- Gudeodiscus Páll-Gergely, 2013
