= List of non-marine molluscs of Vietnam =

Location of Vietnam

The non-marine molluscs of Vietnam are a part of the molluscan fauna of Vietnam (wildlife of Vietnam). A number of species of non-marine mollusks are found in the wild in Vietnam.

There are good reasons to suppose that Vietnam, with a surface of 332,000 km^{2}, a large variety of habitats, and many different limestone 'islands' that differ from each other in faunal composition, will have a rich diversity of terrestrial molluscs. Numerous non-marine mollusc species, including more than 850 species of land gastropods, have been described from the country but many others still await discovery and description.

== Freshwater gastropods ==
Freshwater gastropods in Vietnam include:

Neritidae

- Neripteron violaceum

Ampullariidae

- Pila polita
- Pila conica
- Pila ampullacea
- Pomacea canaliculata - golden apple snail
- Pomacea maculata (d'Orbigny, 1835) - island apple snail

Viviparidae

- Cipangopaludina lecythoides
- Idiopoma umblicata
- Sinotaia quadrata
- Mekongia lithophaga
- Mekongia hainesiana
- Filopaludina sumatrensis
- Angulyagra polyzonata
- Angulyagra duchieri
- Angulyagra boettgeri

Pachychilidae

- Adamietta reevei
- Brotia annamita
- Brotia dautzenbergiana
- Brotia hoabinhensis
- Brotia swinhoei
- Sulcospira collyra
- Sulcospira dakrongensis
- Sulcospira hainanensis
- Sulcospira housei
- Sulcospira proteus
- Sulcospira quangtriensis
- Sulcospira tonkiniana
- Sulcospira touranensis
- Sulcospira vietnamensis
- Semisulcospira aubryana
- Paracrostoma paludiformis

Paludomidae

- Paludomus messageri (Bavay & Dautzenberg, 1900)

Potamididae (brackish water snails)

- Cerithidea sp.

Thiaridae

- Melanoides tuberculata (O. F. Müller, 1774) - red-rimmed melania
- Neoradina prasongi
- Sermyla riquetii - synonym: Sermyla tornatela
- Tarebia granifera (Lamarck, 1822) - quilted melania
- Mieniplotia scabra

Assimineidae

- Assiminea francoisi
- Assiminea interrupta
- Assiminea obtusa
- Assiminea lutea
- Optediceros breviculum - red mangrove snail

Bithyniidae

- Digoniostoma siamensis
- Parafossarulus striatulus - synonym: Parafossarulus manchouricus
- Bithynia longicornis
- Bithynia misella
- Bithynia fuchsiana
- Bithynia goniomphalos
- Wattebledia crosseana

Pomatiopsidae

- Neoprososthenia levayi - synonym: Paraprososthenia levayi
- Lacunopsis harmandi
- Tricula ovata
- Tricula similunaris
- Vietricula - 11 species

Stenothyridae

- Stenothyra divalis
- Stenothyra messageri
- Stenothyra monilifera
- Stenothyra polita
- Stenothyra cyrtochila
- Stenothyra ovata
- Stenothyra conica
- Stenothyra alba
- Stenothyra schlickumi Brandt, 1968

Iravadiidae (marine/brackish)

- Fluvicingula elegantula (A. Adams, 1861)
- Iravadia cochinchinensis (Bavay & Dautzenberg, 1910)
- Iravadia ornata Blanford, 1867
- Iravadia quadrasi (O. Boettger, 1893)
- Iravadia rohdei (Brandt, 1968)
- Pseudomerelina mahimensis (Melvill, 1893)
- Hyala sp.

Buccinidae

- Clea helena (Meder in Philippi, 1847)

Lymnaeidae

- Austropeplea viridis (Quoy & Gaimard, 1832)
- Radix auricularia (Linnaeus, 1758) - synonym: Lymnaea swinhoei
- Radix rubiginosa (Michelin, 1831)

Planorbidae

- Polypylis hemisphaerula (Benson, 1842)
- Gyraulus convexiusculus (Hutton, 1849)

== Land gastropods ==
Land gastropods in Vietnam include:

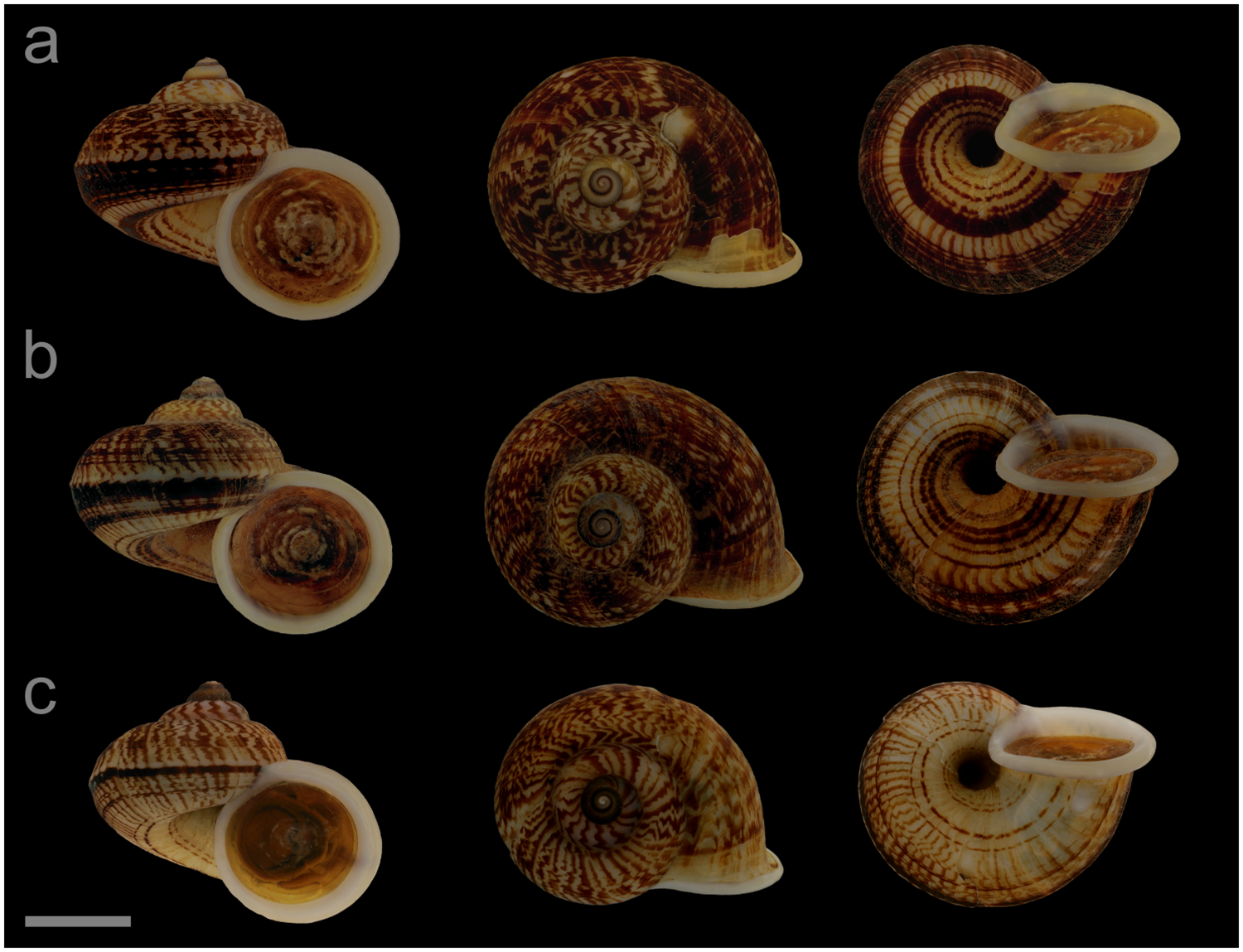
Specimens of Cyclophorus phongnhakebangensis (a: holotype, b and c: paratypes; scale bar: 10 mm)

Cyclophoridae

- Chamalycaeus depressus (Bavay et Dautzenberg, 1912)
- Chamalycaeus fraterculus (Bavay et Dautzenberg, 1900)
- Chamalycaeus heudei (Bavay et Dautzenberg, 1900)
- Chamalycaeus paviei (Bavay et Dautzenberg, 1912)
- Dioryx compactus (Bavay et Dautzenberg, 1900)
- Dioryx messageri (Bavay et Dautzenberg, 1900)
- Dioryx vanbuensis (Bavay et Dautzenberg, 1900)
- Laotia christahemmenae Páll-Gergely, 2014
- Cyclophorus affinis Theobald, 1858
- Cyclophorus amoenus (Pfeiffer, 1854)
- Cyclophorus aquilus (Sowerby, 1843)
- Cyclophorus aurantiacus pernobilis Gould, 1844
- Cyclophorus bensoni (Pfeiffer, 1854)
- Cyclophorus cambodgensis Morlet, 1884
- Cyclophorus cantori (Benson, 1851)
- Cyclophorus clouthianus Möllendorff, 1882
- Cyclophorus consociatus Smith, 1893
- Cyclophorus courbeti Ancey, 1888
  - Cyclophorus courbeti courbeti Ancey, 1888
  - Cyclophorus courbeti leucostoma Dautzenberg et Fischer, 1905
- Cyclophorus cucphuongensis Oheimb, 2019
- Cyclophorus cryptomphalus Benson, 1857
- Cyclophorus dilatatus Heude, 1886
- Cyclophorus dodrans
  - Cyclophorus dodrans dodrans Mabille, 1887
  - Cyclophorus dodrans fasciatus Kobelt, 1908
- Cyclophorus donghoiensis Thach et Huber, 2017
- Cyclophorus eudeli Smith, 1893
- Cyclophorus expansus (Pfeiffer, 1853)
- Cyclophorus fargesianus Heude, 1885
- Cyclophorus fasciatus Kobelt, 1908
- Cyclophorus floridus (Pfeiffer, 1854)
- Cyclophorus fruhstorferi
  - Cyclophorus fruhstorferi fruhstorferi Möllendorff, 1901
  - Cyclophorus fruhstorferi langsonensis Kobelt, 1908
- Cyclophorus fulguratus Pfeiffer, 1852
- Cyclophorus haughtoni Theobald, 1858
- Cyclophorus herklotsi Martens, 1861
- Cyclophorus huberi Thach, 2016
- Cyclophorus ignilabris Möllendorff, 1901
- Cyclophorus implicatus Bavay et Dautzenberg, 1908
  - Cyclophorus implicatus implicatus Bavay et Dautzenberg, 1908
  - Cyclophorus implicatus kanhoensis Do et Do, 2019
- Cyclophorus jourdyi Morlet, 1886
- Cyclophorus labiosus (Pfeiffer, 1854)
- Cyclophorus malayanus (Benson, 1852)
- Cyclophorus mansuyi Dautzenberg et Fischer, 1908
- Cyclophorus martensianus Möllendorff, 1874
- Cyclophorus massiei Morlet, 1891
- Cyclophorus monachus (Morelet, 1866)
- Cyclophorus muspratti Godwin-Austen et Beddome, 1894
- Cyclophorus orthostylus Möllendorff, 1898
- Cyclophorus paracucphuongensis Oheimb, 2019
- Cyclophorus paviei Morlet, 1884
- Cyclophorus phongnhakebangensis Oheimb, 2019
- Cyclophorus polystictus Möllendorff, 1901
- Cyclophorus pyrostoma Möllendorff, 1882
- Cyclophorus saturnus Pfeiffer, 1862
- Cyclophorus siamensis (Sowerby, 1850)
- Cyclophorus songmaensis Morlet, 1891
- Cyclophorus speciosus (Philippi, 1847)
- Cyclophorus subfloridus Ancey, 1888
- Cyclophorus takumisaitoi Hirano, 2019
- Cyclophorus tamdaoensis Do et Do, 2019
- Cyclophorus tetrachrous Mabille, 1887
- Cyclophorus theodori Ancey, 1888
- Cyclophorus tornatus Morlet, 1892
- Cyclophorus trouiensis
  - Cyclophorus trouiensis trouiensis Wattebled, 1886
  - Cyclophorus trouiensis bendei Varga, 1972
  - Cyclophorus trouiensis omphalotropis Möllendorff, 1900
- Cyclophorus unicus Mabille, 1887
- Cyclophorus volvulus (O.F. Müller, 1774)
- Cyclophorus zebrinus (Benson, 1836)
- Cyclotus lubricus (Dautzenberg et Fischer, 1908)
- Japonia fischeri (Morlet, 1886)
- Japonia scissimargo (Benson, 1856)
- Platyrhaphe leucacme Möllendorff, 1901
- Platyraphe sordida (Pfeiffer, 1855)
- Pterocyclos prestoni Bavay et Dautzenberg, 1909
- Rhiostoma morleti Dautzenberg et Fischer, 1905
- Scabrina laciniana (Heude, 1885)
- Scabrina locardi (J. Mabille, 1887)
- Scabrina tonkiniana (J. Mabille, 1887)
- Scabrina vanbuensis (Smith, 1896)

Diplommatinidae

- Diplommatina balansai Morlet, 1886
- Diplommatina clausilioides Bavay et Dautzenberg, 1912
- Diplommatina demangei Bavay et Dautzenberg, 1912
- Diplommatina messageri Ancey, 1903

Pupinidae

- Pupina anceyi Bavay & Dautzenberg, 1899
- Pupina billeti Fischer, 1898
- Pupina brachysoma Ancey, 1903
- Pupina dorri Dautzenberg, 1893
- Pupina douvillei Dautzenberg & Fischer, 1905
- Pupina exclamationis Mabille, 1887
- Pupina flava Möllendorff, 1884
- Pupina illustris Mabille, 1887
- Pupina laffonti Ancey, 1899
- Pupina solidula Möllendorff, 1901
- Pupina sonlaensis Do, 2017
- Pupina thaitranbaii Do, 2017
- Pupina tonkiana Bavay & Dautzenberg, 1899
- Pupina verneaui Dautzenberg & Fischer, 1905
- Pupina vescoi Morelet, 1862
- Pseudopomatias amoenus Möllendorff, 1885
- Pseudopomatias maasseni Páll-Gergely et Hunyadi, 2015
- Pseudopomatias sophiae Páll-Gergely, 2015
- Pupinella mansuyi (Dautzenberg et Fischer, 1908)
- Rhaphaulus tonkinensis Páll-Gergely, 2014
- Streptaulus longituba Páll-Gergely & Gargominy, 2017

Helicinidae

- Geotrochatella jourdyi Dautzenberg, 1895

Hydrocenidae

- Georissa decora Möllendorff, 1900

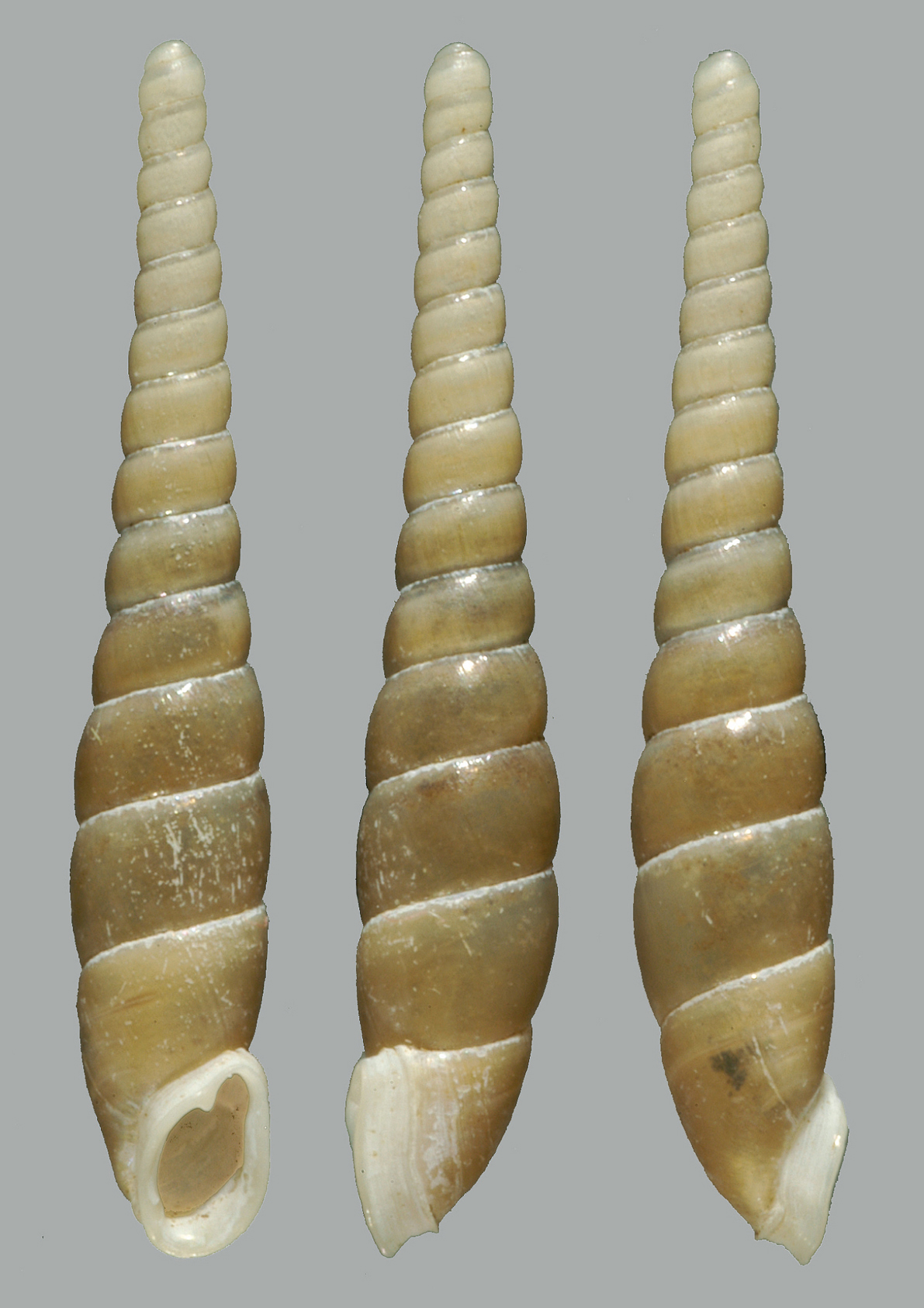
A shell of Leptacme cuongi

Clausiliidae

- Castanophaedusa fontainei Páll-Gergely & Szekeres, 2017
- Castanophaedusa huberi (Thach, 2016)
- Garnieria mouhoti nhuongi Do, 2015
- Grandinenia ardouiniana (Heude, 1885)
- Grandinenia tonkinensis (Nordsieck, 2010)
- Hemiphaedusa babeensis crassitesta Nordsieck, 2011
- Hemiphaedusa porphyrostoma regina Nordsieck, 2011
- Hemiphaedusa thatkheana
  - Hemiphaedusa thatkheana ptychostoma Nordsieck, 2011
  - Hemiphaedusa thatkheana splendida Nordsieck, 2011
- Leptacme cuongi Maassen & Gittenberger, 2007
- Leptocochlea sykesi lethrungtongi Grego & Szekeres, 2011
- Liparophaedusa leptotesta Nordsieck, 2011
- Megalauchenia soror Nordsieck, 2011
- Messageriella gargominyi Páll-Gergely & Szekeres, 2017
- Oospira abstrusa Szekeres, 1970
- Oospira abstrusa ginkae Grego & Szekeres, 2014
- Oospira duci Maassen & Gittenberger, 2007
  - Oospira duci khanhi Nordsieck, 2011
- Oospira haivanensis Chinh & Szekeres, 2019
- Oospira naggsi Luong & Szekeres, 2014
  - Oospira naggsi naggsi Luong & Szekeres, 2014
  - Oospira naggsi parva Páll-Gergely & Szekeres, 2017
- Oospira oviformis Nordsieck, 2011
- Oospira pyknosoma Gittenberger & Vermeulen, 2001
- Oospira triptyx Nordsieck, 2011
- Atractophaedusa smithi Maassen & Gittenberger, 2007
- Phaedusa cochinchinensis (Pfeiffer, 1841)
- Phaedusa lypra pereupleura Nordsieck, 2011
- Phaedusa micropaviei Nordsieck, 2011
- Synprosphyma oospiroides Nordsieck, 2011
- Tropidauchenia bavayi senescens Nordsieck, 2011
- Tropidauchenia (Euryauchenia) fisheri phasmoides Grego & Szekeres, 2011
- Tropidauchenia ootanii longicollis Nordsieck, 2011
- Tropidauchenia palatalis Nordsieck, 2011

Helicarionidae

- Falsiplecta integripedia Schileyko & Semenyuk, 2018
- Laocaia attenuata Kuzminykh, 1999
- Laocaia obesa Kuzminykh, 1999
- Laocaia simovi Dedov & Schneppat, 2019

Streptaxidae - 39 species of Streptaxidae are known from Vietnam

- Discartemon
- Indoartemon
- Perrottetia aberrata (Souleyet, 1852)
- Perrottetia cristatellus (Möllendorff, 1901)
- Perrottetia daedaleus (Bavay & Dautzenberg, 1908)
- Perrottetia dugasti (Morlet, 1892)
- Perrottetia gudei (Fulton, 1915)
- Perrottetia hongthinhae D.-S. Do, 2017
- Perrottetia mabillei (Bavay et Dautzenberg, 1903)
- Perrottetia messageri (Bavay et Dautzenberg, 1908)
- Perrottetia oppidulum (Bavay et Dautzenberg, 1908)
- Perrottetia simonianus (Heude, 1890)
- Stemmatopsis arcuatolabris Do, 2021
- Stemmatopsis nangphaiensis Do & Do, 2015
- Stemmatopsis vanhoensis Do & Do, 2015
- Haploptychius
- Oophana
- Elma Adams, 1866
- Huttonella

Plectopylidae - 16 species are known from Vietnam

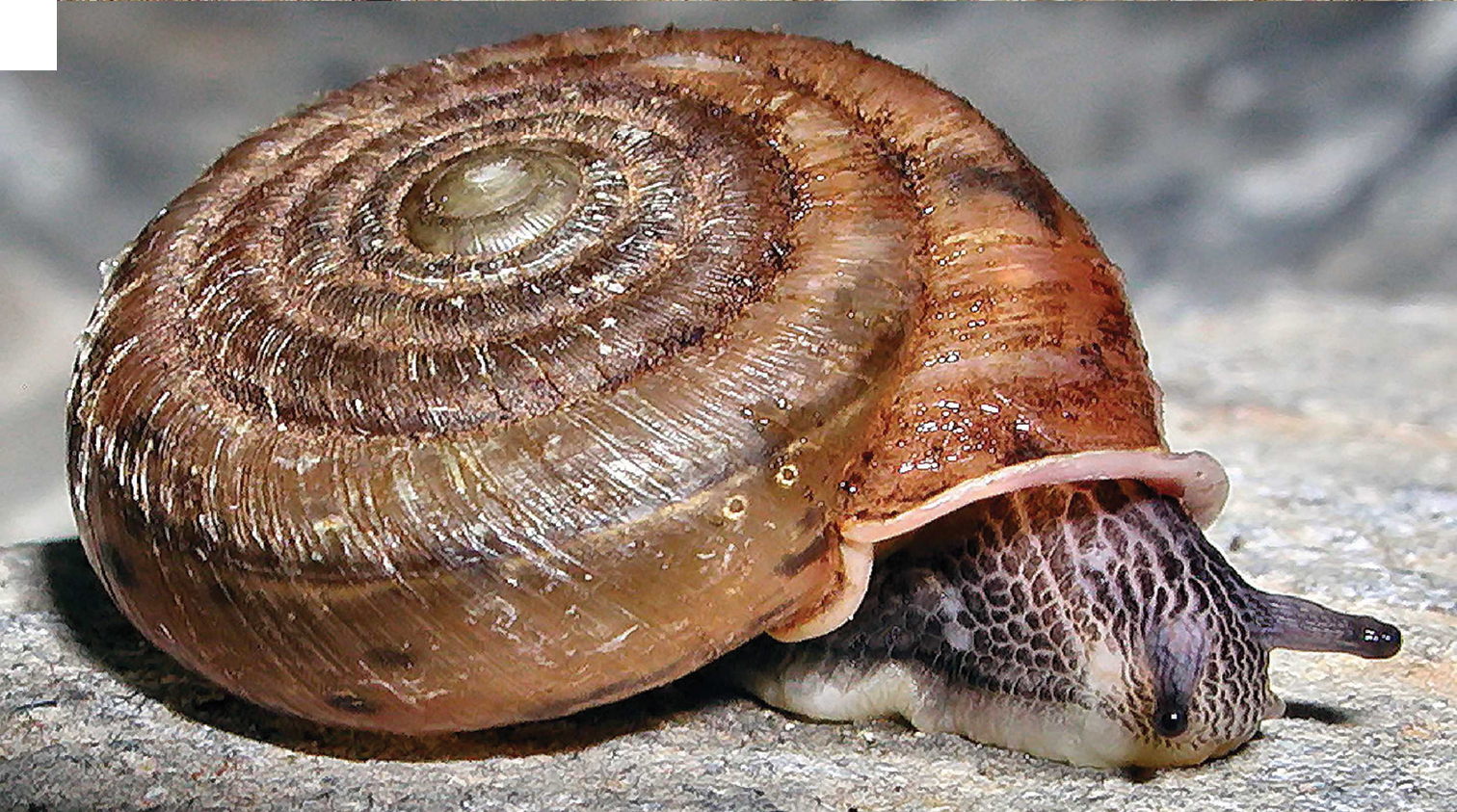
Gudeodiscus messageri

- Gudeodiscus anceyi (Gude, 1901)
- Gudeodiscus cyrtochilus (Gude, 1909)
- Gudeodiscus dautzenbergi (Gude, 1901)
- Gudeodiscus fischeri (Gude, 1901)
- Gudeodiscus francoisi (Fischer, 1898)
- Gudeodiscus giardi (Fischer, 1898)
- Gudeodiscus hemmeni Páll-Gergely & Hunyadi, 2015
- Gudeodiscus infralevis (Gude, 1908)
- Gudeodiscus messageri (Gude, 1909)
- Gudeodiscus phlyarius (Mabille, 1887)
- Gudeodiscus suprafilaris (Gude, 1908)
- Gudeodiscus villedaryi (Ancey, 1888)
- Gudeodiscus emigrans (Möllendorff, 1901)
- Halongella fruhstorferi (Möllendorff, 1901)
- Halongella schlumbergeri (Morlet, 1886)
- Sicradiscus mansuyi (Gude, 1908)

Philomycidae

- Meghimatium bilineatum (Benson, 1842)

Ariophantidae

- Hemiplecta jensi Páll-Gergely, 2019
- Parmarion martensi Simroth, 1894
- Parmarion pupillaris Humbert, 1864

Agriolimacidae

- Deroceras laeve (O. F. Müller, 1774)

Camaenidae

- Amphidromus cambojiensis (Reeve, 1860)
- Amphidromus ingens Möllendorff, 1900
- Amphidromus naggsi Thach & Huber, 2014

== Freshwater bivalves ==
Freshwater bivalves in Vietnam include:

== See also ==
- List of marine molluscs of Vietnam

Lists of molluscs of surrounding countries:

- List of non-marine molluscs of China
- List of non-marine molluscs of Laos
- List of non-marine molluscs of Cambodia
