= List of Cyclophorus species =

Cyclophorus is a large genus of gastropods in the family Cyclophoridae. As of March 2025, there were 214 species recognised in the genus.

== A ==
- Cyclophorus abditus Nantarat & Panha, 2014
- Cyclophorus abletti Thach, 2023
- Cyclophorus aborensis Godwin-Austen, 1915
- Cyclophorus acutimarginatus (G. B. Sowerby I, 1842)
- Cyclophorus aetarum Möllendorff, 1895
- Cyclophorus affinis Theobald, 1858
- Cyclophorus alabastrinus (L. Pfeiffer, 1854)
- Cyclophorus alabatensis Kobelt, 1886
- Cyclophorus altivagus W. H. Benson, 1854
- Cyclophorus amoenus L. Pfeiffer, 1852
- Cyclophorus anhi Thach, 2023
- Cyclophorus appendiculatus L. Pfeiffer, 1854
- Cyclophorus aquilus (G. B. Sowerby I, 1843)
- Cyclophorus arthriticus Theobald, 1864
- Cyclophorus ateribalteiformis D.-N. Chen & G.-Q. Zhang, 1998
- Cyclophorus atramentarium (G. B. Sowerby I, 1843)
- Cyclophorus aurantiacus (Schumacher, 1817)
- Cyclophorus aurora (W. H. Benson, 1851)
- Cyclophorus austenianus Preston, 1914

== B ==
- Cyclophorus balteatus W. H. Benson, 1857
- Cyclophorus bankanus E. von Martens, 1867
- Cyclophorus bapuensis Godwin-Austen, 1915
- Cyclophorus barandae Hidalgo, 1887
- Cyclophorus batanicus Quadras & Möllendorff, 1894
- Cyclophorus beddomeanus Preston, 1914
- Cyclophorus benguetensis Hidalgo, 1888
- Cyclophorus bensoni L. Pfeiffer, 1852
- Cyclophorus borealis Nantarat & Panha, 2019
- Cyclophorus bustoi Hidalgo, 1888

== C ==
- Cyclophorus cambodgensis Morlet, 1885
- Cyclophorus canaliferus (G. B. Sowerby I, 1842)
- Cyclophorus cantori (W. H. Benson, 1851)
- Cyclophorus caothaii Thach & F. Huber, 2020
- Cyclophorus ceratodes Möllendorff, 1895
- Cyclophorus ceylanicus L. Pfeiffer, 1852
- Cyclophorus charpentieri (Mousson, 1849)
- Cyclophorus chitwanus Greke, 2024
- Cyclophorus cicatricosus Gredler, 1894
- Cyclophorus clouthianus Möllendorff, 1882
- Cyclophorus consociatus E. A. Smith, 1893
- Cyclophorus cornutus Kobelt, 1902
- Cyclophorus coronensis Möllendorff, 1895
- Cyclophorus courbeti Ancey, 1888
- Cyclophorus crassalabella Godwin-Austen, 1888
- Cyclophorus crocatus (Born, 1778)
- Cyclophorus cruentus E. von Martens, 1865
- Cyclophorus cryptomphalus W. H. Benson, 1857
- Cyclophorus cucphuongensis K. C. M. von Oheimb, 2019
- Cyclophorus cucullatus (A. Gould, 1856)
- Cyclophorus cybeus (W. H. Benson, 1857)

== D ==
- Cyclophorus daoae Thach, 2023
- Cyclophorus daraganicus Hidalgo, 1888
- Cyclophorus delavayanus Heude, 1885
- Cyclophorus denselineatus L. Pfeiffer, 1852
- Cyclophorus dilatatus Heude, 1886
- Cyclophorus diplochilus Möllendorff, 1894
- Cyclophorus dodrans Mabille, 1887
- Cyclophorus donghoiensis Thach & F. Huber, 2017
- Cyclophorus dubius (Morelet, 1881)

== E ==
- Cyclophorus ectopoma Möllendorff, 1896
- Cyclophorus elegans Möllendorff, 1881
- Cyclophorus eudeli E. A. Smith, 1893
- Cyclophorus everetti E. A. Smith, 1893
- Cyclophorus exaltatus (L. Pfeiffer, 1855)
- Cyclophorus excellens L. Pfeiffer, 1854
- Cyclophorus expansus L. Pfeiffer, 1852

== F ==
- Cyclophorus fargesianus Heude, 1885
- Cyclophorus fasciatus Kobelt, 1908
- Cyclophorus fernandezi Hidalgo, 1888
- Cyclophorus ferruginosus Heude, 1885
- Cyclophorus flavilabris W. H. Benson, 1860
- Cyclophorus floridus (L. Pfeiffer, 1855)
- Cyclophorus formosaensis G. Nevill, 1881
- Cyclophorus franzhuberi Thach, 2017
- Cyclophorus friesianus Möllendorff, 1883
- Cyclophorus frinianus Heude, 1885
- Cyclophorus fruhstorferi Möllendorff, 1901
- Cyclophorus fulguratus (L. Pfeiffer, 1854)
- Cyclophorus fultoni Godwin-Austen & R. H. Beddome, 1894
- Cyclophorus fuscicolor Godwin-Austen, 1876

== G ==
- Cyclophorus granum Morelet, 1881

== H ==
- Cyclophorus hangmonensis Raheem & S. Schneider, 2017 †
- Cyclophorus haughtoni Theobald, 1858
- Cyclophorus hebereri B. Rensch, 1933
- Cyclophorus hejingi Thach & F. Huber, 2020
- Cyclophorus herklotsi E. von Martens, 1861
- Cyclophorus himalayanus L. Pfeiffer, 1852
- Cyclophorus hirasei Pilsbry, 1901
- Cyclophorus horridulum (Morelet, 1882)
- Cyclophorus huberi Thach, 2016
- Cyclophorus hunganhi Thach & F. Huber, 2020

== I ==
- Cyclophorus ibyatensis L. Pfeiffer, 1854
- Cyclophorus ignilabris Möllendorff, 1901
- Cyclophorus implicatus Bavay & Dautzenberg, 1909
- Cyclophorus indicus (Deshayes, 1832)
- Cyclophorus involvulus (O. F. Müller, 1774)

== J ==
- Cyclophorus jerdoni (W. H. Benson, 1851)
- Cyclophorus johnabbasi Thach, 2020
- Cyclophorus jourdyi Morlet, 1886

== K ==
- Cyclophorus khongensis Thach & F. Huber, 2017
- Cyclophorus kibleri Fulton, 1907
- Cyclophorus kikaiensis Pilsbry, 1902
- Cyclophorus kinabaluensis E. A. Smith, 1895
- Cyclophorus koboensis Godwin-Austen, 1915
- †Cyclophorus kubarensis T. Hirano & Matsuoka, 2024

== L ==
- Cyclophorus labiosus (L. Pfeiffer, 1854)
- Cyclophorus leai (Tryon, 1869)
- Cyclophorus leucostomus (L. Pfeiffer, 1852)
- Cyclophorus linguiferus (G. B. Sowerby I, 1843)
- Cyclophorus lingulatus (G. B. Sowerby I, 1843)
- Cyclophorus loloensis Heude, 1890
- Cyclophorus luridus (L. Pfeiffer, 1852)

== M ==
- Cyclophorus malayanus (W. H. Benson, 1852)
- Cyclophorus mansuyi Dautzenberg & H. Fischer, 1908
- Cyclophorus martensianus Möllendorff, 1874
- Cyclophorus massiei Morlet, 1891
- Cyclophorus menkeanus (R. A. Philippi, 1847)
- Cyclophorus microscopicus Morelet, 1881
- Cyclophorus moellendorffi Schmacker & O. Boettger, 1891
- Cyclophorus monachus (Morelet, 1866)
- Cyclophorus muii Thach, 2023
- Cyclophorus muspratti Godwin-Austen & R. H. Beddome, 1894

== N ==
- Cyclophorus nagaensis Godwin-Austen & R. H. Beddome, 1894
- Cyclophorus ngankingensis Heude, 1882
- Cyclophorus ngheanensis Thach & F. Huber, 2018
- Cyclophorus niahensis Godwin-Austen, 1889
- Cyclophorus nicobaricus L. Pfeiffer, 1865
- Cyclophorus nigricans (L. Pfeiffer, 1862)
- Cyclophorus nilagiricus (W. H. Benson, 1852)

== O ==
- Cyclophorus occultus Nantarat & Panha, 2019
- Cyclophorus ophis Hanley, 1876
- Cyclophorus orthostylus Möllendorff, 1898
- Cyclophorus ouwensianus van Heurn & Paravicini, 1922

== P ==
- Cyclophorus palawanensis (E. A. Smith, 1893)
- Cyclophorus paracucphuongensis K. C. M. von Oheimb, 2019
- Cyclophorus patens W. T. Blanford, 1862
- Cyclophorus paviei Morlet, 1885
- Cyclophorus pealianus G. Nevill, 1877
- Cyclophorus pearsoni (W. H. Benson, 1851)
- Cyclophorus perdix (Broderip & G. B. Sowerby I, 1830)
- Cyclophorus philippinarum (G. B. Sowerby I, 1842)
- Cyclophorus phongnhakebangensis P. V. von Oheimb, 2019
- Cyclophorus phukhetensis Thach & F. Huber, 2020
- Cyclophorus picturatus (L. Pfeiffer, 1854)
- Cyclophorus plateni Dohrn, 1889
- Cyclophorus pliciferus E. von Martens, 1900
- Cyclophorus poeciloneurus Godwin-Austen & R. H. Beddome, 1894
- Cyclophorus polynema (L. Pfeiffer, 1855)
- Cyclophorus polystictus Möllendorff, 1901
- Cyclophorus porphyriticus (W. H. Benson, 1851)
- Cyclophorus prietoi Hidalgo, 1888
- Cyclophorus primaevus (F. Sandberger, 1870) †
- Cyclophorus pterocyclus Möllendorff, 1895
- Cyclophorus punctatulus Heude, 1885
- Cyclophorus punctatus (Grateloup, 1840)
- Cyclophorus pyrostoma Möllendorff, 1882
- Cyclophorus pyrotrema W. H. Benson, 1854

== Q ==
- Cyclophorus quadrasi Hidalgo, 1888

== R ==
- Cyclophorus rafflesii (Broderip & G. B. Sowerby I, 1830)
- Cyclophorus rangunensis Kobelt, 1908
- Cyclophorus raripilus Morelet, 1881
- Cyclophorus reevei Hidalgo, 1888
- Cyclophorus renkeri Thach & F. Huber, 2020
- †Cyclophorus robustus Y.-T. Li, 1984

== S ==
- Cyclophorus saturnus L. Pfeiffer, 1862
- Cyclophorus schepmani Laidlaw, 1957
- Cyclophorus schwabei Thach & F. Huber, 2020
- Cyclophorus scurra W. H. Benson, 1857
- Cyclophorus semisulcatus (G. B. Sowerby I, 1843)
- Cyclophorus semperi Kobelt, 1886
- Cyclophorus sericatus Ancey, 1888
- Cyclophorus sericinus Quadras & Möllendorff, 1894
- Cyclophorus serratizona Hanley & Theobald, 1876
- Cyclophorus siamensis (G. B. Sowerby I, 1850)
- Cyclophorus sidiensis Godwin-Austen, 1915
- Cyclophorus smithi Hidalgo, 1890
- Cyclophorus songmaensis Morlet, 1891
- Cyclophorus sowerbyi Hidalgo, 1888
- Cyclophorus speciosus (R. A. Philippi, 1847)
- Cyclophorus spironema (L. Pfeiffer, 1855)
- Cyclophorus stenomphalus (L. Pfeiffer, 1846)
- Cyclophorus stevenabbasorum Thach, 2016
- Cyclophorus stungtrengensis Thach & F. Huber, 2018
- Cyclophorus subcarinatus Möllendorff, 1882
- Cyclophorus subfloridus Ancey, 1888
- Cyclophorus sublaevigatus W. T. Blanford, 1869
- Cyclophorus sumatrensis (L. Pfeiffer, 1855)
- Cyclophorus szechwanensis Yen, 1939

== T ==
- Cyclophorus taeniatus (L. Pfeiffer, 1855)
- Cyclophorus takumisaitoi T. Hirano, 2019
- Cyclophorus talboti Godwin-Austen, 1889
- Cyclophorus telifer Möllendorff, 1889
- Cyclophorus tetrachrous Mabille, 1887
- Cyclophorus thachi F. Huber, 2020
- Cyclophorus thainguyenensis Thach, 2023
- Cyclophorus thakhekensis Thach & F. Huber, 2018
- Cyclophorus theobaldianus W. H. Benson, 1857
- Cyclophorus theodori Ancey, 1888
- Cyclophorus thersites (Shuttleworth, 1852)
- Cyclophorus tigrinus (G. B. Sowerby I, 1843)
- Cyclophorus tornatus Morlet, 1893
- Cyclophorus trochiformis Kobelt, 1884
- Cyclophorus trouiensis Wattebled, 1886
- Cyclophorus tryblium W. H. Benson, 1854
- Cyclophorus tuanhae Thach, 2023
- Cyclophorus turgidus L. Pfeiffer, 1852

== U ==
- Cyclophorus unicus Mabille, 1887

== V ==
- Cyclophorus validus (G. B. Sowerby I, 1842)
- Cyclophorus volvulus (O. F. Müller, 1774)
- Cyclophorus vonhaiensis Thach, 2023

== W ==
- Cyclophorus woodianus (I. Lea, 1840)

== Y ==
- †Cyclophorus youngi Yen, 1936

== Z ==
- Cyclophorus zebra (Grateloup, 1840)
- Cyclophorus zebrinus (W. H. Benson, 1836)

== Former species ==
- Cyclophorus atomus Morelet, 1882 synonymized with Tornus atomus (Morelet, 1882)
- Cyclophorus borneensis Metcalf, 1859 synonymized with Cyclophorus perdix borneensis (Metcalfe, 1851)
- Cyclophorus convexiusculus (L. Pfeiffer, 1855) synonymized with Chondrocyclus convexiusculus (L. Pfeiffer, 1855)
- Cyclophorus cytora Gray, 1850 synonymized with Cytora cytora (Gray, 1850)
- Cyclophorus intermedius E. von Martens, 1897 synonymized with Maizania elatior (E. von Martens, 1892)
- Cyclophorus kibonotoensis D'Ailly, 1910 synonymized with Maizania hildebrandti kibonotoensis (D'Ailly, 1910)
- Cyclophorus leonensis Morelet, 1873 synonymized with Maizaniella leonensis (Morelet, 1873)
- Cyclophorus lilliputianus Morelet, 1873 synonymized with Maizaniella lilliputiana (Morelet, 1873)
- Cyclophorus minimus Melvill & Ponsonby, 1898 synonymized with Chondrocyclus isipingoensis (Sturany, 1898)
- Cyclophorus pinnulifer Benson, 1857 synonymized with Scabrina pinnulifer (Benson, 1857)
- Cyclophorus preussi E. von Martens, 1892 synonymized with Maizaniella preussi (E. von Martens, 1892)
- Cyclophorus salleanus E. von Martens, 1865 synonymized with of Aperostoma mexicanum salleanum (E. von Martens, 1865)
- Cyclophorus underwoodi Da Costa, 1900 synonymized with Barbacyclus underwoodi (Da Costa, 1900)
- Cyclophorus upolensis Mousson, 1865 synonymized with Ostodes upolensis (Mousson, 1865)
- Cyclophorus vandellii Nobre, 1886 synonymized with Thomeomaizania vandellii (Nobre, 1886)
- Cyclophorus volkensi E. von Martens, 1895 synonymized with Maizania volkensi (E. von Martens, 1895)
- Cyclophorus wahlbergi (Benson, 1852) synonymized with Maizania wahlbergi (Benson, 1852)
