= List of non-marine molluscs of Thailand =

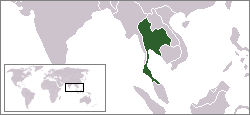
Location of Thailand

The non-marine mollusks of Thailand are a part of the molluscan fauna of Thailand (the wildlife of Thailand). A number of species of non-marine mollusks are found in the wild in Thailand.

There is known at least 23 families, 57 genera and 125 species of land gastropods from Eastern Thailand.

There is known at least 8 species of freshwater gastropods and at least 2 species of freshwater bivalves from the Sakaeo Province in the Eastern Thailand.

Many of the freshwater species are traditionally used as food.

Summary table of number of species

| | Thailand |
|---|---|
| freshwater gastropods | at least 8 species in the Sakaeo Province |
| land gastropods | over 125 (125 species from Eastern Thailand) |
| gastropods altogether | over 132 species |
| freshwater bivalves | at least 2 species |
| molluscs altogether | over 134 species |

== Freshwater gastropods ==
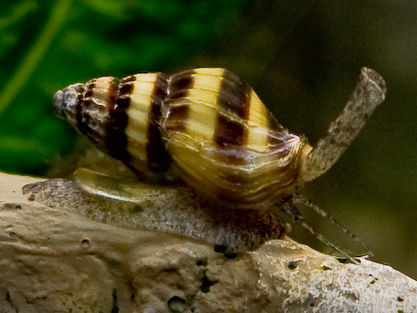
The freshwater snail Clea helena is one of about 10 freshwater species within the mostly marine family Buccinidae (total about 1500 species).

The lower Mekong River area, which includes parts of Thailand, Laos and Cambodia, is considered to be a biodiversity hotspot for freshwater gastropods, with dominant taxa from the families Pomatiopsidae, Stenothyridae, Buccinidae and Marginellidae.

Ampullariidae

- Pila ampullacea (Linnaeus, 1758)
- Pila pesmei (Morelet, 1889)
- Pila polita (Deshayes, 1830)

Viviparidae

- Bellamya chinensis (Gray, 1834)
- Eyriesia eyriesi (Morelet, 1865)
- Filopaludina martensi martensi (Frauenfeld, 1865)
- Filopaludina sumatrensis (Dunker, 1852)
  - Filopaludina sumatrensis polygramma
  - Filopaludina sumatrensis speciosa

Pachychilidae

- Sulcospira housei (I. Lea, 1856)

Thiaridae

- Melanoides jugicostis (Hanley and Theobald, 1876)
- Tarebia granifera (Lamarck, 1822)
- Thiara scabra (Müller, 1774)
- Melanoides tuberculata (O. F. Müller, 1774)

Bithyniidae

- Bithynia funiculata (Walker, 1927)
- Bithynia siamensis (Morelet, 1866)
  - Bithynia siamensis siamensis (Morelet, 1866)
  - Bithynia siamensis goniomphalos (Morelet, 1866)
- Gabbia erawanensis (Prayoonhong, Chitramvong & Upatham, 1990)
- Gabbia pygmaea (Preston, 1908)
- Gabbia wykoffi (Brandt, 1968)
- Hydrobioides nassa (Theobald, 1865)
- Wattebledia baschi (Brandt, 1968)
- Wattebledia crosseana (Wattebled, 1886)
- Wattebledia siamensis (Moellendorff, 1902)

Pomatiopsidae

- Tricula bollingi Davis, 1968

Buccinidae

- Clea helena (Meder in Philippi, 1847)

== Land gastropods ==
Hydrocenidae

- 5 species of Georissa or 4 species or 3

Cyclophoridae

- Cyclophorus affinis Theobald, 1858
- Cyclophorus amoenus (Pfeiffer, 1854)
- Cyclophorus aquilus (Sowerby, 1843)
- Cyclophorus aurantiacus pernobilis Gould, 1844
- Cyclophorus bensoni (Pfeiffer, 1854)
- Cyclophorus cantori (Benson, 1851)
- Cyclophorus consociatus Smith, 1893
- Cyclophorus courbeti courbeti Ancey, 1888
- Cyclophorus cryptomphalus Benson, 1857
- Cyclophorus expansus (Pfeiffer, 1853)
- Cyclophorus floridus (Pfeiffer, 1854)
- Cyclophorus fulguratus Pfeiffer, 1852
- Cyclophorus haughtoni Theobald, 1858
- Cyclophorus herklotsi Martens, 1861
- Cyclophorus labiosus (Pfeiffer, 1854)
- Cyclophorus malayanus (Benson, 1852) – indigenous
- Cyclophorus pfeifferi Reeve, 1861
- Cyclophorus saturnus Pfeiffer, 1862
- Cyclophorus siamensis (Sowerby, 1850)
- Cyclophorus songmaensis Morlet, 1891
- Cyclophorus speciosus (Philippi, 1847)
- Cyclophorus subfloridus Ancey, 1888
- Cyclophorus volvulus (O. F. Müller, 1774) – indigenous
- Cyclophorus zebrinus (Benson, 1836)
- Cyclophorus sp.
- Cyclotus setosus (Möllendorff, 1894)
- Leptopoma perlucidum (Grateloup, 1840)
- Leptopoma roepstorffianum G. Nevill, 1878
- Leptopoma vitreum (Lesson, 1831) – indigenous
- 3 Leptopoma sp.
- Pterocyclus cf. cuming
- Pearsonia lamphunensis S. Tumpeesuwan & C. Tumpeesuwan, 2015
- Pterocyclus sp. – indigenous
- Rhiostoma cambodjensis Morelet, 1875– indigenous
- Rhiostoma housei (Haines, 1855)– indigenous
- Rhiostoma smithi Bartsch, 1932
- Scabrina laotica Möllendorff, 1897
- Alycaeus sp. A – E
- Diolyx sp.

Diplommatinidae

- Diplommatina burapha Dumrongrojwattana, Kamtuptim & Wongkamhaeng, 2020
- Diplommatina chadathongae Kamtuptim, Dumrongrojwattana & Wongkamhaeng, 2020
- Diplommatina chantaburiensis Dumrongrojwattana, Kamtuptim & Wongkamhaeng, 2020
- Diplommatina crispata khaochamaoensis Panha et al., 1998
- Diplommatina doichiangdao Panha & Burch, 1998
- Diplommatina fusiformis Dumrongrojwattana, Kamtuptim & Wongkamhaeng, 2020
- Diplommatina khwantongae Dumrongrojwattana, Kamtuptim & Wongkamhaeng, 2020

Pupinidae

- Pupina bipalatalis O. Boettger, 1890
- cf. Pupina compacta Möllendorff, 1897
- Pupina siamensis Möllendorff, 1902
- Pupina sp.
- Tortulosa tortuosa (Gray, 1825)

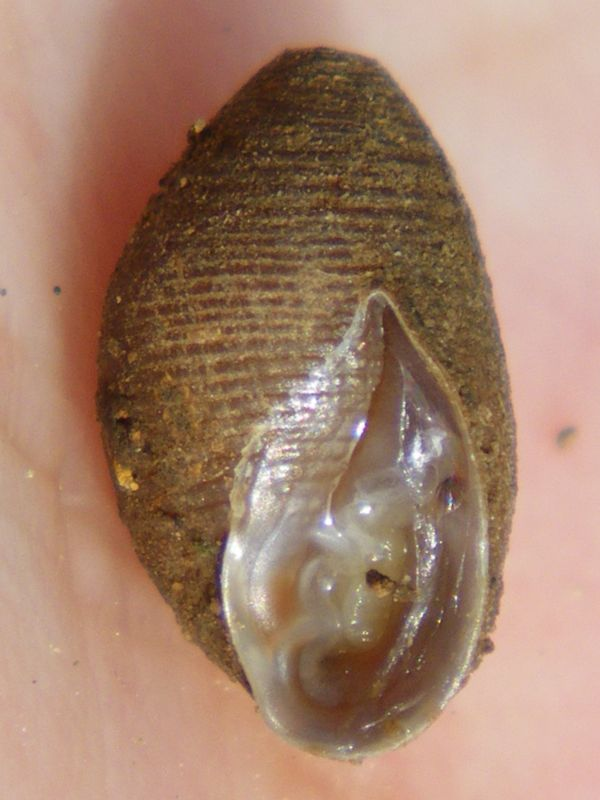
Laemodonta siamensis

Ellobiidae

- Auriculastra elongata (Küster, 1845)
- Cassidula aurisfelis (Bruguière, 1789)
- Cassidula mustelina (Deshayes, 1830)
- Cassidula multiplicata Martens, 1865
- Ellobium aurismidae (Linnaeus, 1758)
- Ellobium aurisjudae (Linnaeus, 1758)
- Laemodonta siamensis (Morelet, 1875)
- Laemodonta punctigera (H. Adams & A. Adams, 1854)
- Laemodonta punctatostriata (H. Adams & A. Adams, 1854)
- Melampus siamemsis E. von Martens, 1865
- Melampus cf. castaneus
- Melampus sp.
- Pythia plicata (Férussac, 1821)
- Pythia trigona (Troschel, 1838)

Amphibolidae

- Salinator sp.

Onchidiidae

- Onchidium sp. A – B
- Platevindax sp.

Rathouisiidae

- Atopos sp.

Veronicellidae

- Semperula sp.

Pupillidae

- Acinolaemus colpodon F. G. Thompson & Upatham, 1997
- Acinolaemus stenopus F. G. Thompson & Upatham, 1997
- Acinolaemus sp. A – C
- Anauchen srakeoensis Panha & J. B. Burch, 2004
- Anauchen srakeo
- Aulacospira khaopratun Dumrongrojwattana & Panha, 2005
- Aulacospira depressus P. Dumrongrojwattana & S. Panha, 2006
- Aulacospira platychoncha P. Dumrongrojwattana, 2006
- Aulacospira pluangtong S. Panha & J.B. Burch, 2004
- Aulacospira samaesarnensis P. Dumrongrojwattana, 2006
- Aulacospira tamkhaobote P. Dumrongrojwattana, 2006
- Gastrocopta pisiti P. Dumrongrojwattana, 2006
- Gastrocopta sp.
- Gyliotrachela diarmaidi Panha & JB Burch, 2003
- Gyliotrachela haochongensis S. Panha & J.B. Burch, 2002
- Gyliotrachela khaochakan S. Panha & J.B. Burch, 2002 / Gyliotrachela khaochagan
- Gyliotrachela khawongensis Panha, 1997
- Gyliotrachela srirachaensis Panha & J. B. Burch, 2004
- Gyliotrachela srichang (Panha & J. B. Burch, 2002)
- Gyliotrachela srakaewensis P. Dumrongrojwattana, 2006
- Gyliotrachela sp.
- Hypselostoma khaowongensis Panha, 1997
- Nesopupa sp. A – B
- Systellostoma sp.

Clausiliidae

- Oospira cambodjensis L. Pfeiffer, 1861

Subulinidae

- Lamellaxis gracilis (Hutton, 1834)

Achatinidae

- Achatina fulica Bowdich, 1822

Pyramidulidae

- Pyramidula sp.

Streptaxidae

- Discartemon moolenbeeki Maassen, 2016
- Odontartemon costulatus O. F. von Möllendorff, 1883
- Odontartemon sp.
- Gonaxis protractus (A. A. Gould, 1856)
- Perrottetia aquilonaria Siriboon & Panha, 2013
- Perrottetia dermapyrrhosa Siriboon & Panha, 2013
- Perrottetia phuphamanensis Siriboon & Panha, 2013

Diapheridae

- Diaphera prima Panha, 2010
- Diaphera sp. A – D
- Sinoennea loeiensis Tanmuangpak & Tumpeesuwan, 2015
- Sinoennea panhai Páll-Gergely & Hunyadi in Páll-Gergely, A. Reischütz, Maassen, Grego & Hunyadi, 2020
- Sinoennea prima Panha & J. B. Burch, 1999
- Sinoennea ranongensis Panha, 2005
- Sinoennea reischuetzorum Maassen, 2016
- Sinoennea stunensis Dumrongrojwattana & Wongkamhaeng, 2013
- Sinoennea sutchariti Páll-Gergely & Hunyadi in Páll-Gergely, A. Reischütz, Maassen, Grego & Hunyadi, 2020

Plectopylidae

- Plectopylis achatina (J.E. Gray, 1834)

Succineidae

- Succinea sp.

Trochomorphidae

- Trochomorpha sp.

Dyakiidae

- Dyakia salangana (Martens, 1883)
- Phuphania costata Tumpeesuwan & Tumpeesuwan, 2014
- Phuphania globosa Tumpeesuwan, Naggs & Panha, 2007
- Quantula weinkauffiana (Moellendorff, 1894) – photo of the shell. Is Quantula weinkauffiana synonym for Quantula striata or for Hemiplecta weinkauffiana (Crosse & Fischer)? cf. Daston & Copeland (1993).

Gastrodontidae

- Poecilozonites sp.

Zonitidae

- Videna sp. A – B

Helicarionidae

- Aenigmatoconcha clivicola C. Tumpeesuwan & S. Tumpeesuwan, 2017
- Aenigmatoconcha sumonthai Tumpeesuwan & Tumpeesuwan, 2018
- Durgella libas Solem, 1966
- Sesara megalodon Blanford, 1902
- Sesara parva Solem, 1966
- Sesara triodon Tanmuangpak & Tumpeesuwan in Tanmuangpak, Tumpeesuwan & Tumpeesuwan, 2017

Ariophantidae

- Austenia sp.
- Cryptaustenia sp.
- Cryptozona siamensis (L. Pfeiffer, 1856)
- Hemiplecta distincta (Pfeiffer, 1851)
- Hemiplecta siamensis (L. Pfeiffer, 1856)
- Hemiplecta weinkauffiana (J. C. H. Crosse)
- Macrochlamys limbata Möllendorff, 1894
- Macrochlamys sp. 1
- Macrochlamys sp. 2
- Macrochlamys sp. A – C
- Megaustenia siamensis (Haines, 1855)
- Parmarion sp.
- Syama splendens (Benson, 1838)

Bradybaenidae

- Aegista sp.
- Pseudobuliminus siamensis (J. H. Redfield, 1853)

Camaenidae

- Amphidromus atricallosus (Gould, 1843)
- Amphidromus inversus O. F. Müller, 1774
- Amphidromus schomburgki (Pfeiffer, 1860)
- Amphidromus xiengensis Morlet, 1891
- Amphidromus cf. areolatus (Pfeiffer, 1861)
- Amphidromus (Syndromus) sp.
- Amphidromus sp. A – B
- Chloritis diplochone Möllendorff, 1898
- Chloritis siamensis Möllendorff, 1902
- Ganesella cf. capitium
- Ganesella sp.
- Landouria winteriana (Pfeiffer, 1842)

== Freshwater bivalves ==
Unionidae

- Pilsbryoconcha exilis (I. Lea, 1838) – Pilsbryoconcha exilis exilis and Pilsbryoconcha exilis compressa
- Scabies phaselus (Lea, 1856)

== See also ==
Molluscs of surrounding countries:

- List of non-marine molluscs of Cambodia
- List of non-marine molluscs of Laos
- List of non-marine molluscs of Malaysia
- List of non-marine molluscs of Myanmar

General:

- List of species native to Thailand
