= List of non-marine molluscs of Cambodia =

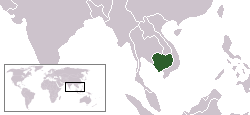
Location of Cambodia

The non-marine mollusks of Cambodia are a part of the molluscan fauna of Cambodia (the wildlife of Cambodia). A number of species of non-marine mollusks are found in the wild in Cambodia.

== Freshwater gastropods ==
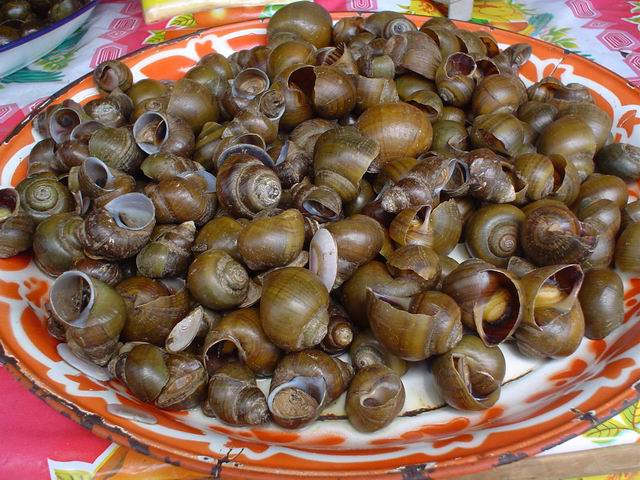
Freshwater snails from the family Ampullariidae are used in Cambodian cuisine

The lower Mekong River area, which includes parts of Thailand, Laos and Cambodia, is considered to be a biodiversity hotspot for freshwater gastropods, with dominant taxa from the families Pomatiopsidae, Stenothyridae, Buccinidae and Marginellidae.

Pomatiopsidae

- Neotricula aperta (Temcharoen, 1971)

Ampullariidae

- ...

== Land gastropods ==
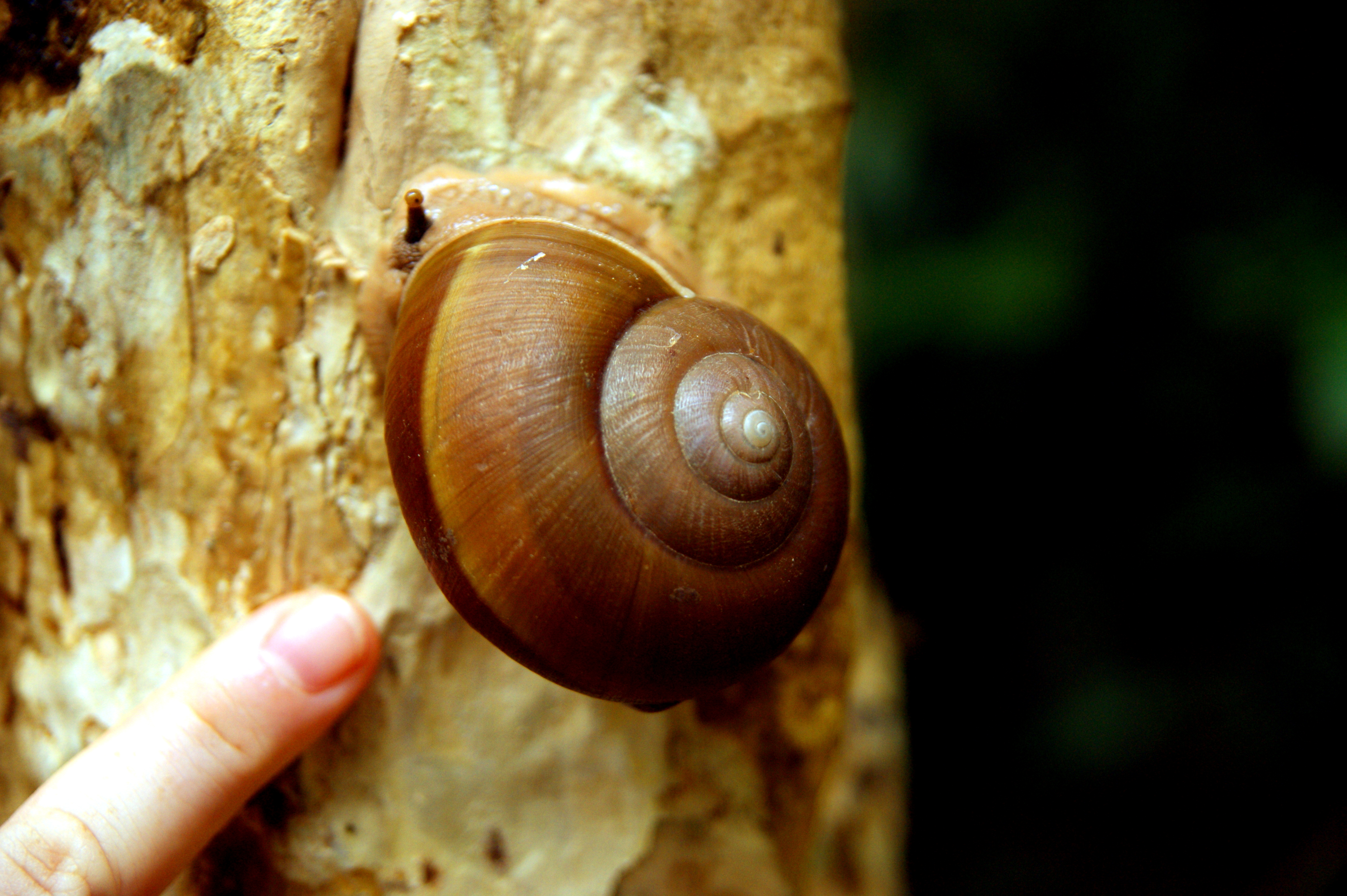
An unidentified land snail from Cambodia

Cyclophoridae

- Cyclophorus bensoni (Pfeiffer, 1854)
- Cyclophorus cambodgensis Morlet, 1884
- Cyclophorus cantori (Benson, 1851)
- Cyclophorus fulguratus Pfeiffer, 1852
- Cyclophorus paviei Morlet, 1884
- Cyclophorus pfeifferi Reeve, 1861
- Cyclophorus saturnus Pfeiffer, 1862
- Cyclophorus speciosus (Philippi, 1847)
- Cyclophorus volvulus (O.F. Müller, 1774)

Camaenidae

- Amphidromus

Dyakiidae

- Quantula striata (Gray, 1834)
- Bertia cambjiensis
- Bertia pergrandis

Diapheridae

- Diaphera saurini Benthem Jutting, 1962

== Bivalvia ==
Cyrenidae

- Corbicula baudoni
- Corbicula blandiana
- Corbicula bocourti
- Corbicula castanea
- Corbicula cyreniformis
- Corbicula erosa
- Corbicula lydigiana
- Corbicula moreletiana
- Corbicula siamensis
- Corbicula tenuis

Unionidae

- Ensidens ingallsianus
- Ensidens sagittarius
- Harmandia somboriensis
- Radiatula pilata
- Pseudodon inoscularis

== See also ==
- List of marine molluscs of Cambodia

Lists of molluscs of surrounding countries:

- List of non-marine molluscs of Thailand
- List of non-marine molluscs of Laos
- List of non-marine molluscs of Vietnam
- List of non-marine molluscs of Malaysia
