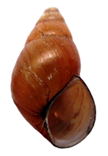
- Apertural view of the shell of Bithynia siamensis siamensis

Conservation status
- Least Concern (IUCN 3.1)

Scientific classification
- Kingdom: Animalia
- Phylum: Mollusca
- Class: Gastropoda
- Subclass: Caenogastropoda
- Order: Littorinimorpha
- Superfamily: Truncatelloidea
- Family: Bithyniidae
- Genus: Bithynia
- Species: B. siamensis

Binomial name
- Bithynia siamensis Lea, 1856

= Bithynia siamensis =

Species of gastropod

Bithynia siamensis is a species of a freshwater snail with a gill and an operculum, an aquatic prosobranch gastropod mollusk in the family Bithyniidae.

Apertural view of the shell of Bithynia siamensis goniomphalus

== Subspecies ==
WHO (1995) recognized the following subspecies:

- Bithynia siamensis siamensis - synonym: Bithynia siamensis goniomphalus
- Bithynia siamensis funiculata
- Bithynia siamensis laevis

Bithynia siamensis and Bithynia funiculata (synonym: Bithynia goniomphala) were recognized as separate species in the 2012 IUCN Red List.

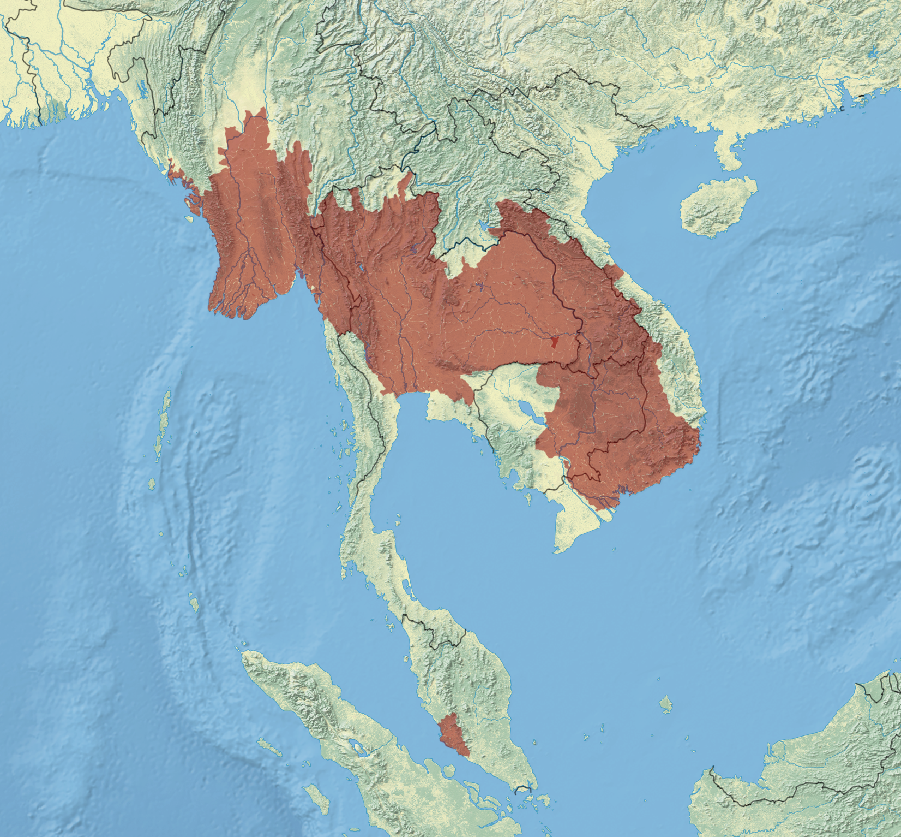
Distribution map of Bithynia siamensis.

== Distribution ==
This species occurs in:

- Cambodia
- Laos
- Malaysia
- Myanmar
- Thailand
- Vietnam

The population of Bithynia siamensis fluctuates during the year.

== Parasites ==
Bithynia siamensis serves as a first intermediate host for Southeast Asian liver fluke Opisthorchis viverrini. The number of excretory cells of the digestive system is increased in infected Bithynia siamensis.

Parasites of Bithynia siamensis include trematode Multicotyle purvisi.
