= Sulcospira housei =

- Apertural view of a shell of Sulcospira housei

Conservation status
- Least Concern (IUCN 3.1)

Scientific classification
- Kingdom: Animalia
- Phylum: Mollusca
- Class: Gastropoda
- Subclass: Caenogastropoda
- Order: incertae sedis
- Family: Pachychilidae
- Genus: Sulcospira
- Species: S. housei

Binomial name
- Sulcospira housei (I. Lea, 1856)

Synonyms
- Melania housei I. Lea, 1856; Adamietta housei (I. Lea, 1856); Melania schomburgki Suvatti, 1950; Stenomelania housei Lea, 1856

Species of gastropod

Sulcospira housei is a species of freshwater snail with an operculum, an aquatic gastropod mollusk in the family Pachychilidae.

The specific name housei is in honour of Dr. Samuel Reynolds House, who collected type specimens during the American Presbyterian Mission in Siam.

== Distribution ==
This species occurs in:

- Cambodia
- Laos
- Myanmar
- Thailand
- Vietnam

The type locality is "Korat, Takrong River, Siam".
