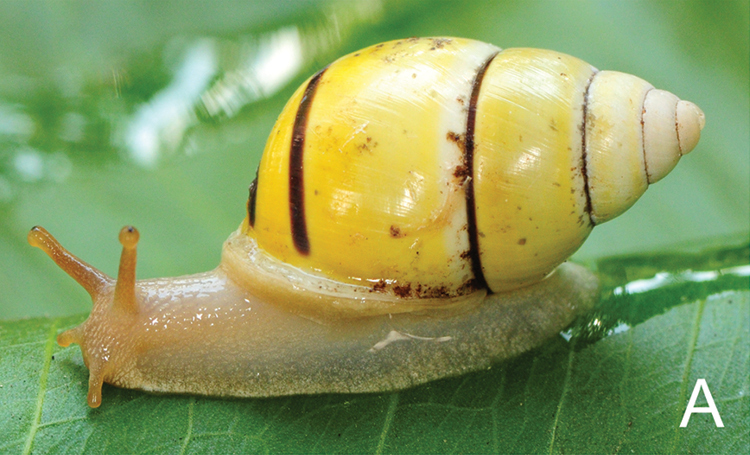
- A live Amphidromus globonevilli

Scientific classification
- Kingdom: Animalia
- Phylum: Mollusca
- Class: Gastropoda
- Order: Stylommatophora
- Family: Camaenidae
- Genus: Amphidromus
- Species: A. globonevilli

Binomial name
- Amphidromus globonevilli Sutcharit & Panha, 2015

= Amphidromus globonevilli =

Species of gastropod

Amphidromus globonevilli is a species of air-breathing land snail, a terrestrial pulmonate gastropod mollusc in the family Camaenidae.

== Distribution ==
Distribution of Amphidromus globonevilli include Tak Province in the western Thailand and Chittagong, Bangladesh.

== Description ==
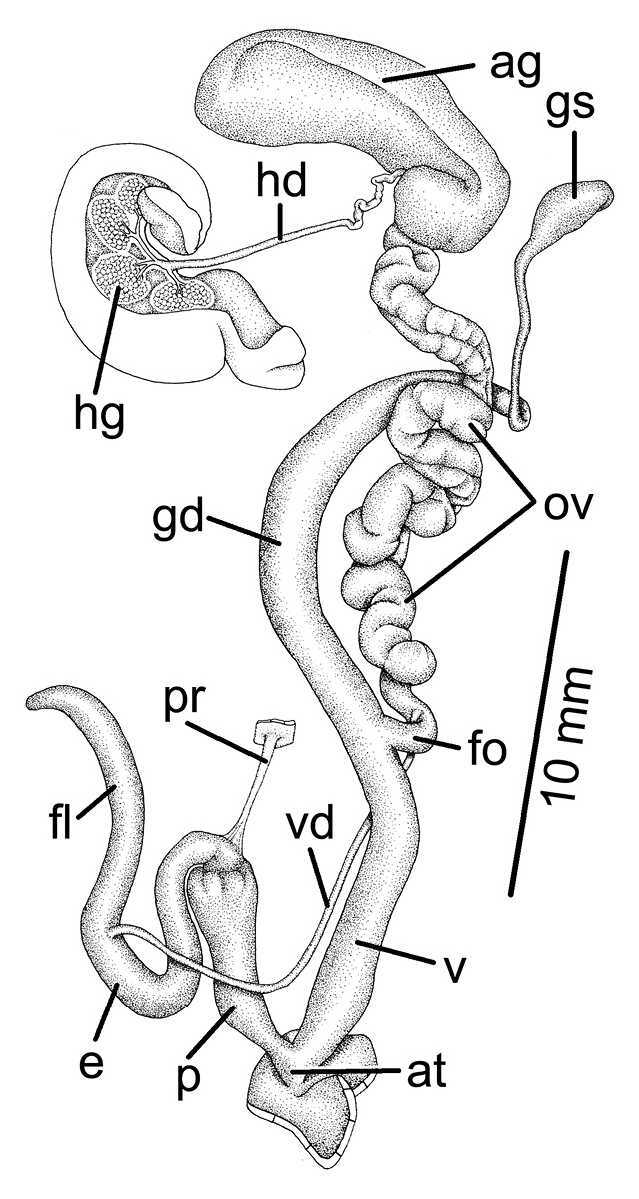
Drawing of a reproductive system of Amphidromus globonevilli.
