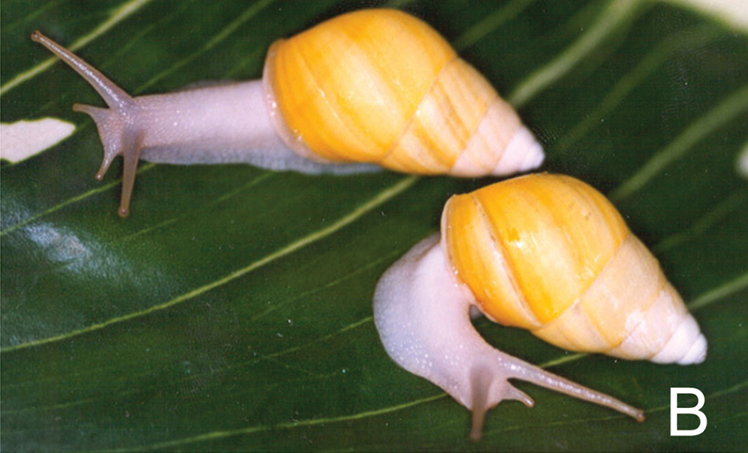
- Two live Amphidromus principalis

Scientific classification
- Kingdom: Animalia
- Phylum: Mollusca
- Class: Gastropoda
- Order: Stylommatophora
- Family: Camaenidae
- Genus: Amphidromus
- Species: A. principalis

Binomial name
- Amphidromus principalis Sutcharit & Panha, 2015

Synonyms
- Amphidromus (Syndromus) principalis Sutcharit & Panha, 2015 alternative representation

= Amphidromus principalis =

Species of gastropod

Amphidromus principalis is a species of air-breathing land snail, a terrestrial pulmonate gastropod mollusc in the family Camaenidae.

== Distribution ==
Distribution of Amphidromus principalis include Nakhon Si Thammarat Province in Thailand.

== Description ==
The length of the shell attains 33.9 mm, its diameter 17.9 mm.

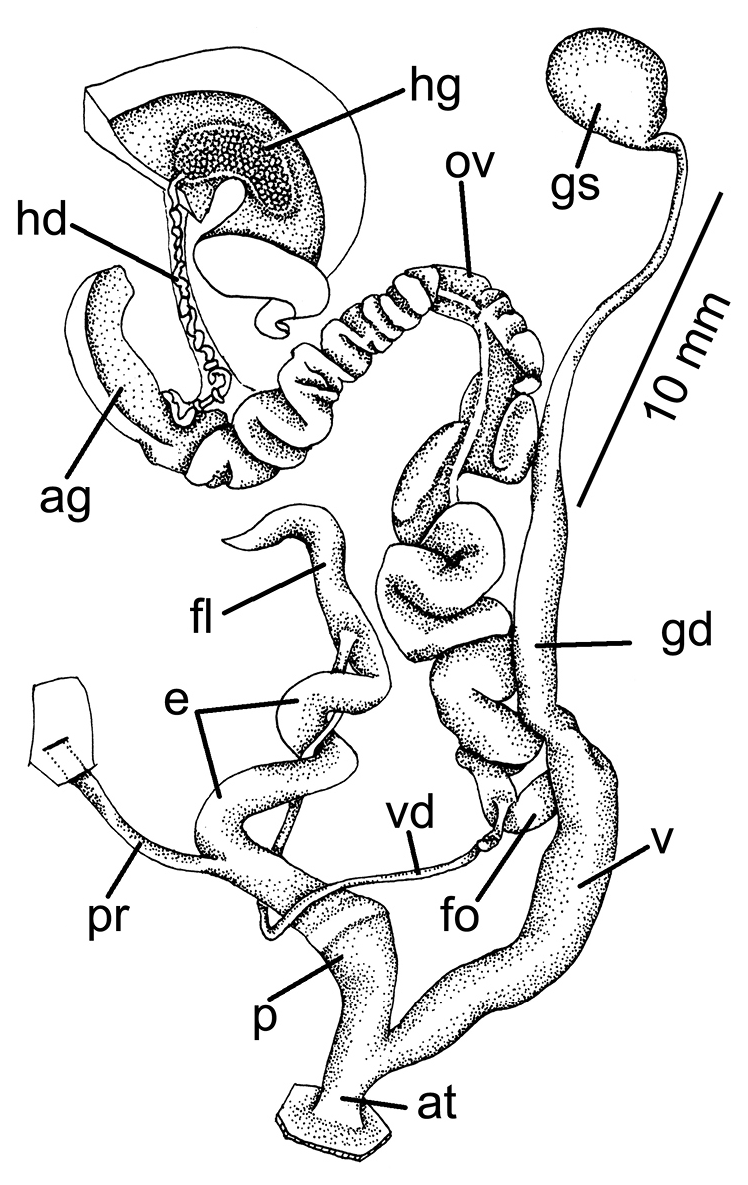
Drawing of a reproductive system of Amphidromus principalis.
