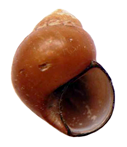
- Apertural view of the shell of Bithynia funiculata

Conservation status
- Least Concern (IUCN 3.1)

Scientific classification
- Kingdom: Animalia
- Phylum: Mollusca
- Class: Gastropoda
- Subclass: Caenogastropoda
- Order: Littorinimorpha
- Superfamily: Truncatelloidea
- Family: Bithyniidae
- Genus: Bithynia
- Species: B. funiculata

Binomial name
- Bithynia funiculata Walker, 1927

Synonyms
- Bithynia goniomphala Morlet, 1891; Bithynia siamensis goniomphalus; Bithynia siamensis funiculata

= Bithynia funiculata =

Species of gastropod

Bithynia funiculata is a species of freshwater snail with a gill and an operculum, an aquatic gastropod mollusk in the family Bithyniidae.

== Taxonomy ==
Previously (for example WHO 1995) considered this taxon to be a subspecies of Bithynia siamensis, however, Bithynia funiculata is treated as a separate species in the 2012 IUCN Red List.

== Distribution ==
Distribution of this species includes:

- Thailand

== Ecology ==
Bithynia funiculata is an intermediate host for:

- The cat liver fluke Opisthorchis tenuicollis
- This species transfers echinostomiasis.
- Some references also mention also the trematode Opisthorchis viverrini as a first intermediate host.
