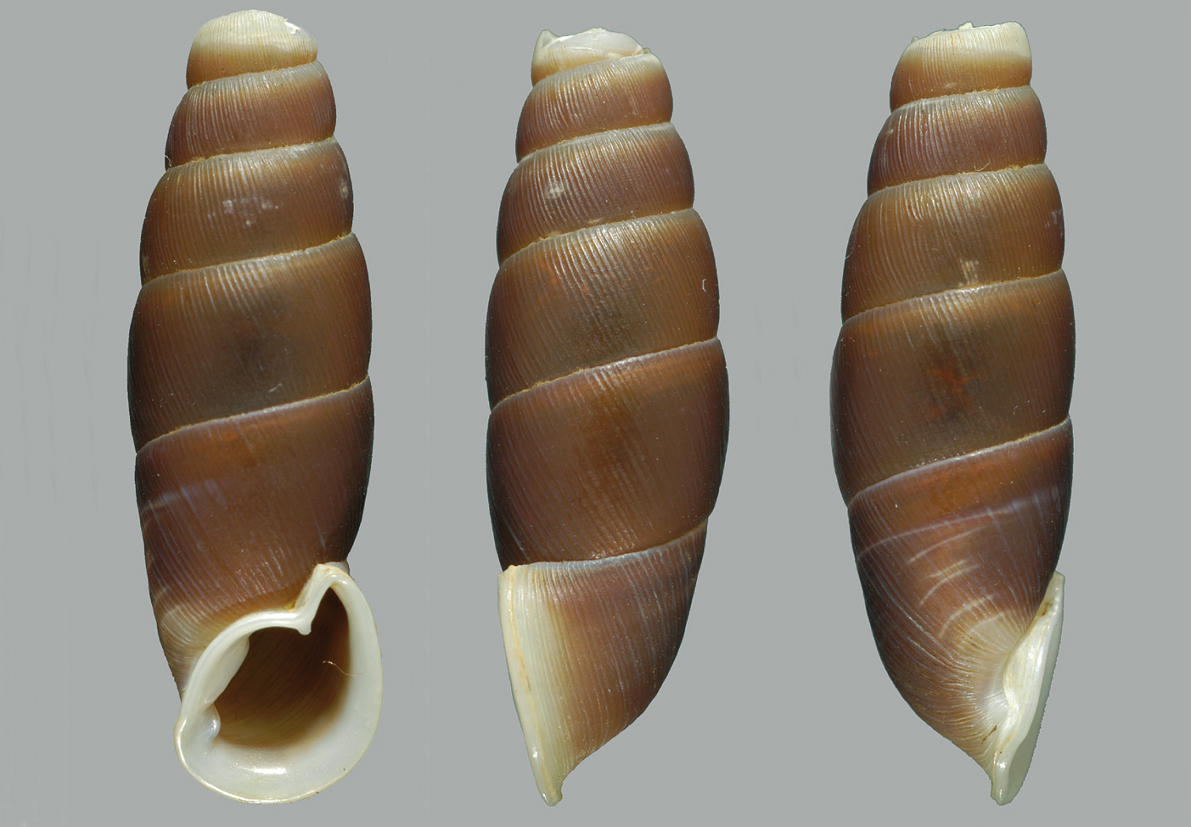
- Three views of the shell which is the holotype of Oospira duci

Scientific classification
- Kingdom: Animalia
- Phylum: Mollusca
- Class: Gastropoda
- Order: Stylommatophora
- Family: Clausiliidae
- Genus: Oospira
- Species: O. duci

Binomial name
- Oospira duci Maassen & Gittenberger, 2007

= Oospira duci =

Species of gastropod

Oospira duci is a species of air-breathing land snail, a terrestrial gastropod mollusk in the family Clausiliidae, the door snails.

This land snail, which was described in 2007, lives in limestone areas in Vietnam. The species was described from just one shell, and thus no details of the anatomy of the soft parts or the radula could be provided. The shell is decollate (which means that several of the earlier whorls have been shed and the shell sealed off anew) making the spire blunt-ended.

The specific name duci is in honor of the biologist Le Thien Duc.

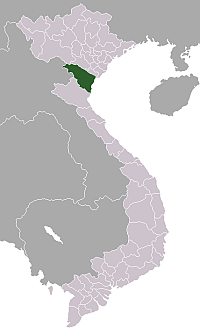
Thanh Hóa Province, in Vietnam, where Oospira duci occurs

== Distribution ==
This species occurs in:

- Vietnam

The type locality is Pu Luong Nature Reserve, on a limestone hill near the small native village Am, 20°27.39'N 105°13.65'E, Thanh Hóa Province, Vietnam.

== Description ==
The shell is dextral, decollate, rather large, more or less fusiform, solid, dark brown, not translucent. Apical whorls are not known. The decollated shell consists of five somewhat flattened whorls, separated by a slightly indented suture and increasing gradually in width. It is sculptured with distinct, regularly arranged ribs (5-8 per mm on the whorl above the aperture), somewhat fading above the aperture and hardly coarser in the cervical region. Neck is without a crest. Aperture is detached, obliquely pear-shaped, whitish inside. Peristome is continuous, whitish, thickened and broadly reflexed; basal side more or less semicircular.

Lamella parietalis (= superior) is connected with the spiralis, rather prominent, reaching the margin of the peristome, which forms an obtuse angle at that site. In frontal view, the lamella columellaris (= inferior) is visible over a relatively long distance as a low, straight lamella ascending into the shell. Lamella subcolumellaris equally well visible in frontal view. Left laterally with six plicae palatales: plica principalis rather short, not visible in frontal view, at the end with five short, slightly curved plicae, somewhat diverging from the principalis and running parallel which each other. Since the single shell that was available has not been opened, details on the inside endings of the lamellae cannot be given.

The width of the shell is 7.0 mm. The height of the shell is 21.5 mm.

Oospira miranda Loosjes & Loosjes-van Bemmel, 1973, is the conchologically most similar species. However, the shell of Oospira miranda is light corneous, more or less smooth, i.e. with only some faint, irregular striae. Its topwhorls increase more rapidly in width, which gives the shell a more fusiform shape, and the lamella subcolumellaris is not visible in a frontal view.

== Ecology ==
Oospira duci is known to inhabit limestone areas.
