= Pterocyclus =

Scientific classification
- Kingdom: Plantae
- Clade: Tracheophytes
- Clade: Angiosperms
- Clade: Eudicots
- Clade: Asterids
- Order: Apiales
- Family: Apiaceae
- Subfamily: Apioideae
- Genus: Pterocyclus; Klotzsch

Species
- See text.

Genus of plants

Pterocyclus is a genus of flowering plant in the family Apiaceae, native from the Himalayas to south-central China and northern Myanmar. The genus was first described by Johann Friedrich Klotzsch in 1862.

== Species ==
As of December 2022, Plants of the World Online accepted the following species:

- Pterocyclus angelicoides (DC.) Klotzsch
- Pterocyclus forrestii (Diels) Pimenov & Kljuykov
- Pterocyclus rotundatus (DC.) Pimenov & Kljuykov
- Pterocyclus wolffianus Fedde ex H.Wolff
