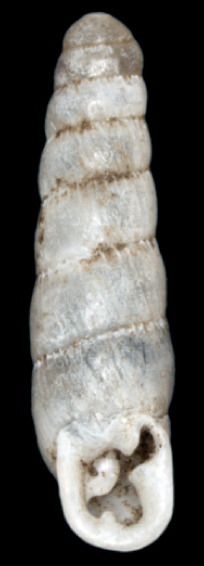

Scientific classification
- Kingdom: Animalia
- Phylum: Mollusca
- Class: Gastropoda
- Order: Stylommatophora
- Family: Streptaxidae
- Genus: Huttonella
- Species: H. bicolor

Binomial name
- Huttonella bicolor (Hutton, 1834)

Synonyms
- Carychium gigas A. Férussac, 1827 (nomen oblitum); Diaphora bicolor (T. Hutton, 1834) superseded combination; Ennea (Huttonella) bicolor (T. Hutton, 1834) superseded combination; Ennea bicolor (T. Hutton, 1834) superseded combination; Ennea ceylanica L. Pfeiffer, 1855 junior subjective synonym; Gulella ( bicolor (T. Hutton, 1834) alternative representation; Indoennea bicolor (T. Hutton, 1834) superseded combination; Pupa (Ennea) ceylanica (L. Pfeiffer, 1855) junior subjective synonym; Pupa bicolor T. Hutton, 1834 (original combination); Pupa cafaeicola Craven, 1880; Pupa largillierti R. A. Philippi, 1844 junior subjective synonym; Pupa mellita A. Gould, 1846

= Huttonella =

Genus of gastropods

Huttonella is a genus of land snails in the family Streptaxidae. It has one species: Huttonella bicolor, known commonly as the two-toned gulella.

== Description ==
The snail has an elongated shell up to 7.5 millimeters long by 2 millimeters wide. In life the shell is orange because the orange color of the body shows through; empty shells are white or pale brown. The shell is smooth with slight ribs at the sutures and larger ribs at the aperture. The aperture also has four teeth.

== Distribution ==
Huttonella was originally distributed in Africa and southwestern Asia. Today it is a tropical cosmopolitan genus.

The original native range of the snail is unclear, but it may have come from Asia or southern Africa. Today it has a broader distribution, having been widely introduced to other regions. It is known in the Caribbean, the southeastern United States, Central and South America, some Pacific Islands, and the Northern Territory in Australia.

Recent records include:

- Dominica, first reported in 2009.
- Brazil, first reported in 2008.
- Nicaragua
- Australia
- The Seychelles, introduced in the mid-19th century and first recorded in 1867.
- Mascarenes

== Ecology ==
This carnivorous snail eats other snails, such as Subulina octona and species of the family Pupillidae.

== Taxonomy ==
The genus has been described as "an artificial, non-monophyletic assemblage of pupiform, elongated streptaxids".
