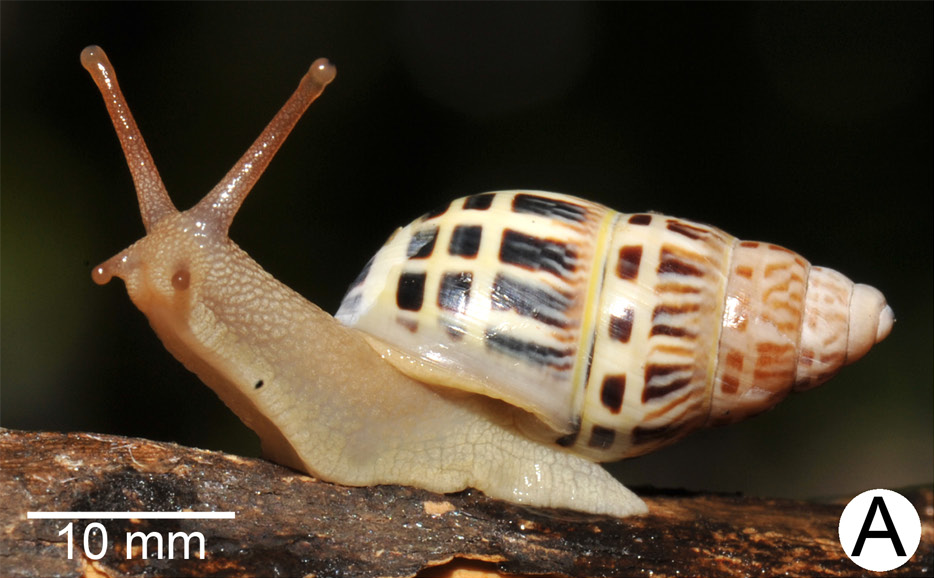
- A live Amphidromus areolatus

Scientific classification
- Kingdom: Animalia
- Phylum: Mollusca
- Class: Gastropoda
- Order: Stylommatophora
- Family: Camaenidae
- Genus: Amphidromus
- Species: A. areolatus

Binomial name
- Amphidromus areolatus (Pfeiffer, 1861)

Synonyms
- Amphidromus (Syndromus) areolatus (L. Pfeiffer, 1861)· accepted, alternate representation; Amphidromus frednaggsi Thach & Huber, 2018 (junior synonym); Amphidromus gerberi Thach & F. Huber, 2017 (junior synonym); Amphidromus pallgergelyi Thach & F. Huber, 2018 (junior synonym); Amphidromus patamakanthini Thach & F. Huber, 2018 (junior synonym); Bulimus areolatus Pfeiffer, 1861

= Amphidromus areolatus =

Species of gastropod

Amphidromus areolatus is a species of air-breathing land snail, a terrestrial pulmonate gastropod mollusc in the family Camaenidae.

== Distribution ==
Distribution of Amphidromus areolatus include Attapeu Province and Champasak Province in southern Laos.

== Description ==
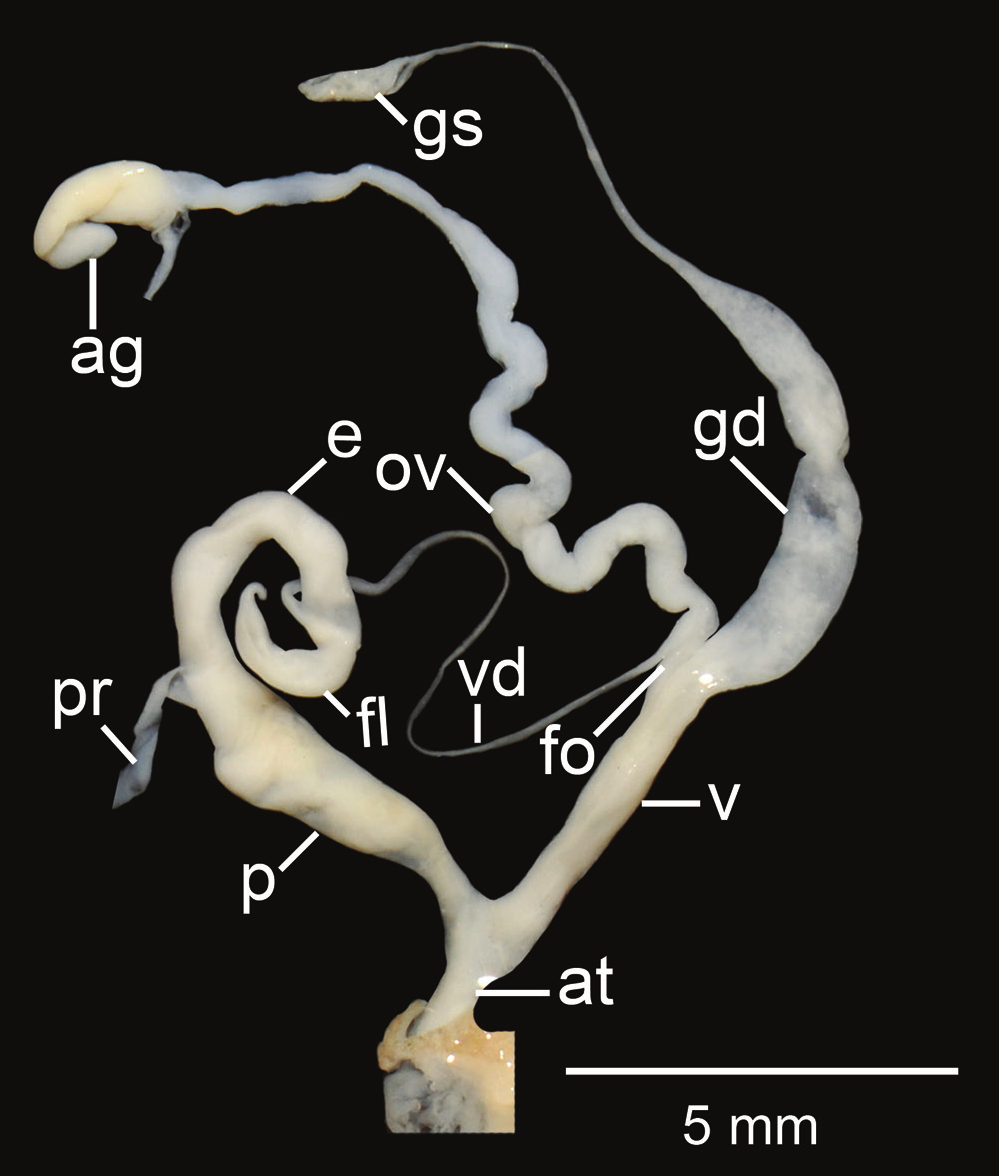
Reproductive system of Amphidromus areolatus.

The length of the shell attains 23 mm, its diameter 11 mm.

The sinistral shell is subperforate, and ovate-conic, appearing thin, striatulate, and somewhat glossy. Its color is buff-whitish, painted with brown flames that generally fork above. The spire is conic, with a minute, brown apex; the suture appears submarginate. Comprising six and a half moderately convex whorls, the body whorl is a little shorter than the spire and rounded beneath, featuring a roseate patch at the columella that is surrounded by a brown and a buff band. The columella appears somewhat swollen and slightly twisted. The aperture is oblique and inverted auriform; the peristome is thin and rather broadly expanded, with the columellar margin narrowly reflexed.

== Ecology ==
Amphidromus areolatus lives in dry dipterocarp forests.
