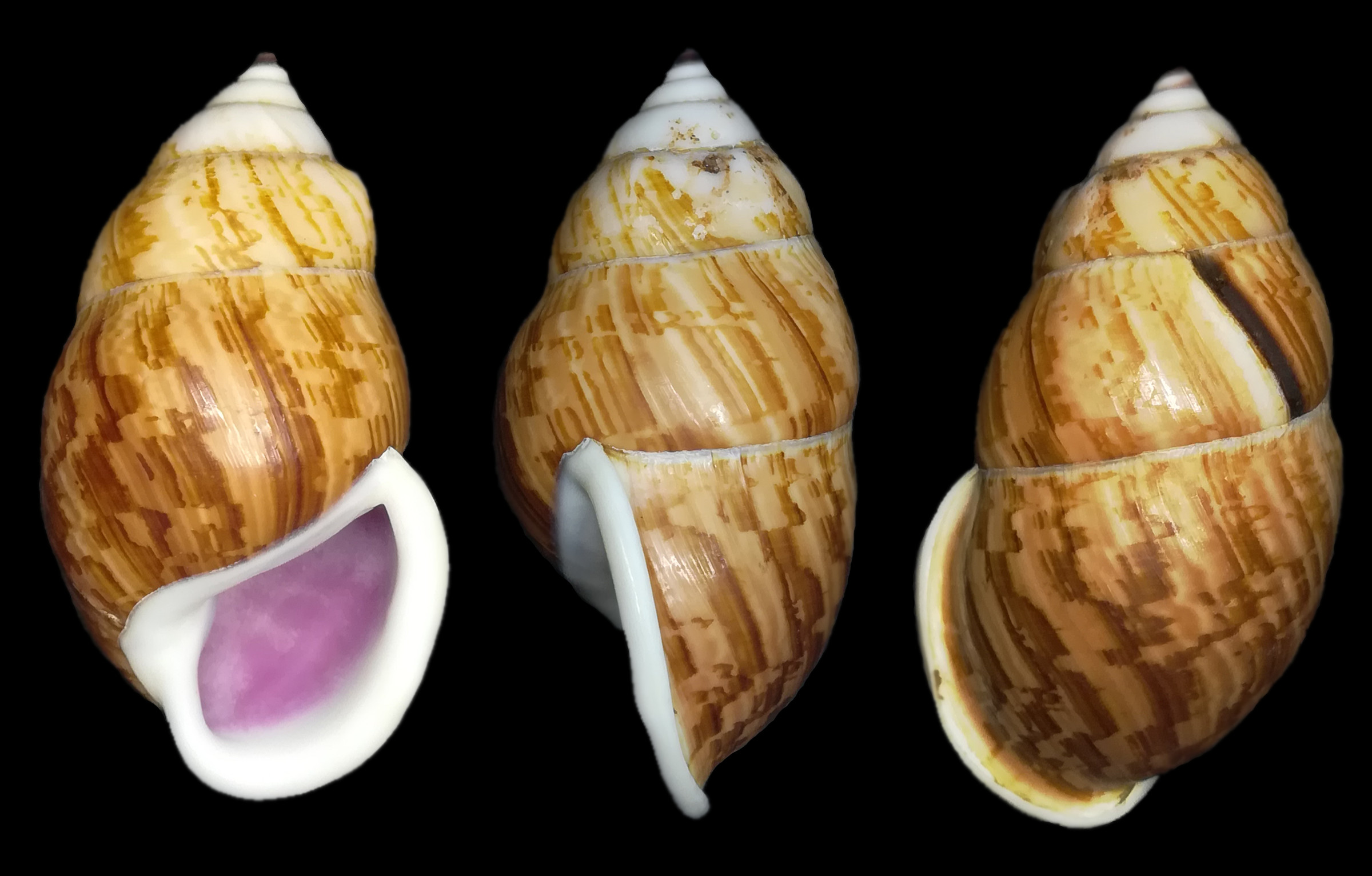

Scientific classification
- Kingdom: Animalia
- Phylum: Mollusca
- Class: Gastropoda
- Order: Stylommatophora
- Family: Camaenidae
- Genus: Amphidromus
- Species: A. cambojiensis

Binomial name
- Amphidromus cambojiensis (Reeve, 1860)

Synonyms
- Amphidromus (Amphidromus) cambojiensis (Reeve, 1860) alternative representation; Amphidromus lamdongensis Thach & F. Huber, 2016 junior subjective synonym; Amphidromus montesdeocai Thach & F. Huber, 2017 junior subjective synonym; Amphidromus schileykoi Thach, 2016 junior subjective synonym; Bulimus cambojiensis Reeve, 1860 (original combination)

= Amphidromus cambojiensis =

Species of snail in the family Camaenidae

Amphidromus cambojiensis is a species of air-breathing land snail, a terrestrial pulmonate gastropod mollusc in the family Camaenidae.

== Description ==
The height of the shell attains 66.6 mm, its diameter 35.1 mm.

(Original description) The shell is sinistral or dextral. It is cylindrically ovate, thick, robust, and pupiform in the spire. It is bluish-white with a faint fawn tint, clouded with oblique, indistinct, wash-like zigzag flames of the same darker hue. The shell contains seven smooth, somewhat bulbous whorls. These are faintly concave below the suture. The aperture is ovate, moderately sized, exhibiting a prominent, opaque, milk-white callus across the body whorl and over the thickly reflected outer lip. The interior is stained with a beautiful iridescent violet-rose.

This species has a relatively large shell and an ovate to elongate conical shape. It possesses a thin corneous periostracum, with irregular brown to dark brown radial streaks on the shell ground colour, and a bright purplish pink or violet colour on the inner side of outer wall.

== Distribution ==
The type locality of this species is Cambodia.
