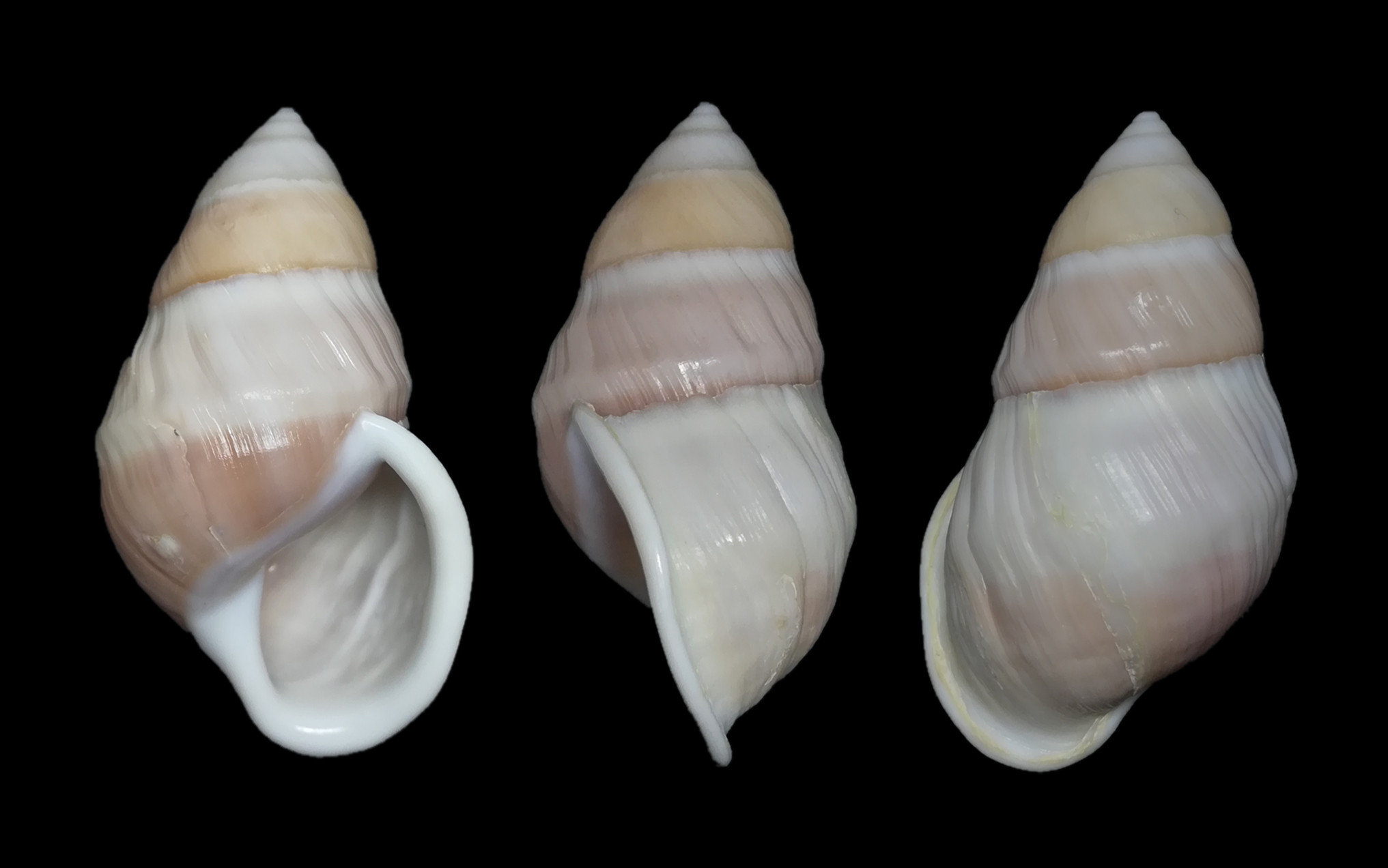
- Shell of Amphidromus ingens

Scientific classification
- Kingdom: Animalia
- Phylum: Mollusca
- Class: Gastropoda
- Order: Stylommatophora
- Family: Camaenidae
- Genus: Amphidromus
- Species: A. ingens

Binomial name
- Amphidromus ingens Möllendorff, 1900

Synonyms
- Amphidromus naggsi Thach & F. Huber, 2014 · unaccepted > junior subjective synonym

= Amphidromus ingens =

Species of snail in the family Camaenidae

Amphidromus ingens is a species of medium-sized air-breathing tree snail, an arboreal gastropod mollusk in the family Camaenidae.

== Description ==
The length of the shell attains 67 mm, its diameter 47.5 mm.

(Original description in Latin) The shell is shortly rimate (with a small, slit-like umbilicus) and can be dextral or, more rarely, sinistral. It exhibits an ovate-conical shape, feels solid, and presents a slightly plicately-striate surface (with fold-like striations) that is decussate (intersected) by minute spiral lines, potentially whitish in color. The spire appears elevated-conoid with somewhat convex sides and a rather acute apex. Comprising seven whorls, the upper ones lie almost flat and are impressed at the suture. The body whorl is surrounded by three elevated bands, of which the middle one is wider and higher, and is excavated below the middle by a rather deep groove, usually appearing malleated here and there. The aperture is slightly oblique and somewhat ear-shaped, being rather effuse at the base. The peristome is broadly expanded, very thickened, and very reflected. The columella is somewhat straight and very callously-thickened above, forming a rather distinct angle with the basal margin, with the margins being joined by a very thick callus.

== Habitat ==
This species lives in trees.

== Distribution ==
The type locality of this species is Vietnam
