= Cyclophorus elegans =

Scientific classification
- Kingdom: Animalia
- Phylum: Mollusca
- Class: Gastropoda
- Subclass: Caenogastropoda
- Order: Architaenioglossa
- Family: Cyclophoridae
- Genus: Cyclophorus
- Species: C. elegans

Binomial name
- Cyclophorus elegans Moellendorff, 1881

Species of gastropod

Cyclophorus elegans is a species of small, air-breathing, land snail with an operculum, terrestrial pulmonate gastropod mollusc in the family Cyclophoridae. It is found in China.
