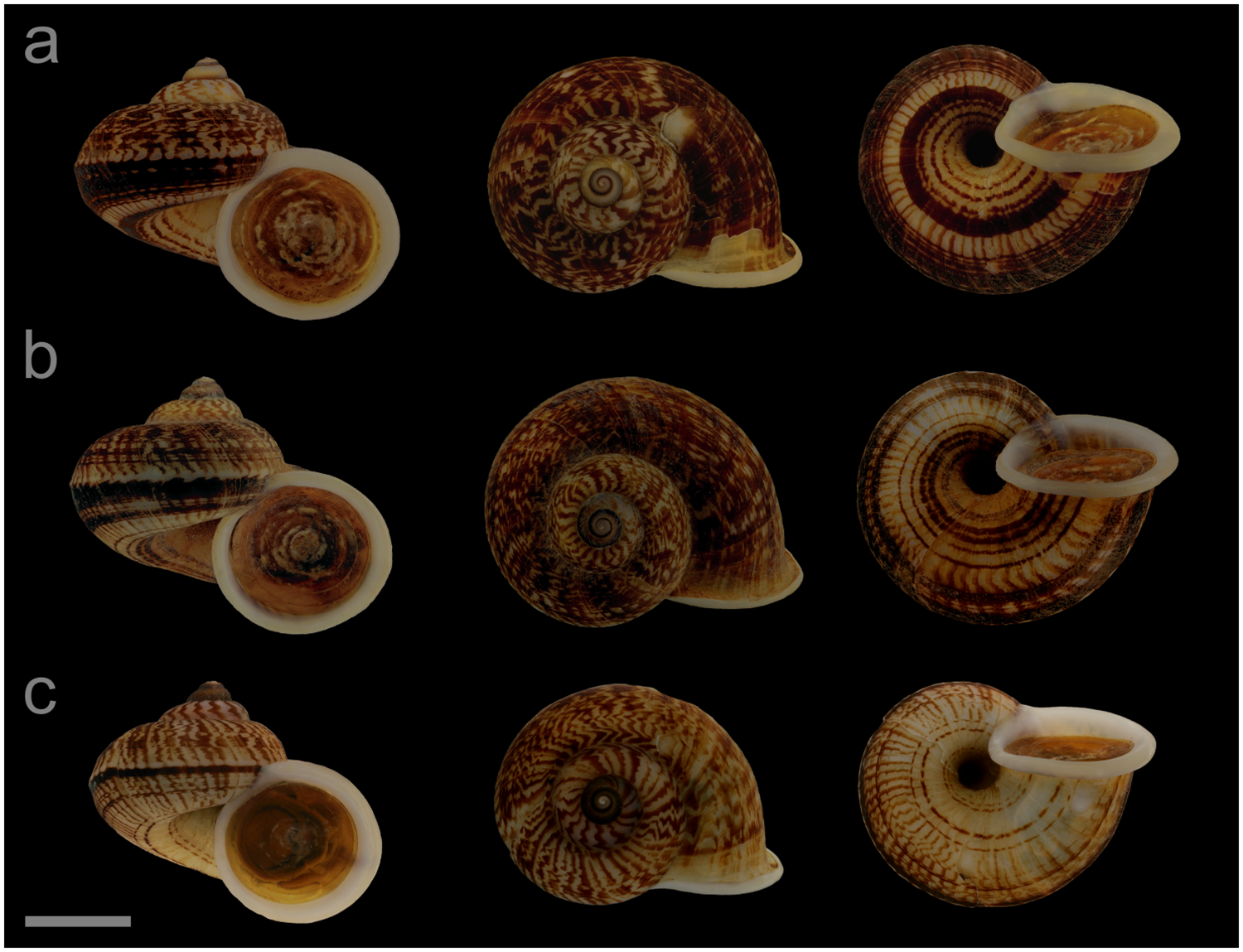
- Specimens of Cyclophorus phongnhakebangensis (a: holotype, b and c: paratypes; scale bar: 10 mm

Scientific classification
- Kingdom: Animalia
- Phylum: Mollusca
- Class: Gastropoda
- Subclass: Caenogastropoda
- Order: Architaenioglossa
- Superfamily: Cyclophoroidea
- Family: Cyclophoridae
- Genus: Cyclophorus
- Species: C. phongnhakebangensis

Binomial name
- Cyclophorus phongnhakebangensis Oheimb, 2019

= Cyclophorus phongnhakebangensis =

Species of gastropod

Cyclophorus phongnhakebangensis is a species of land snail from the family Cyclophoridae.

== Description ==
Cyclophorus phongnhakebangensis is a medium-sized Cyclophorus species with an overall rounded shell shape and a typically circular aperture. Shells have a breadth of 26.0–32.8 mm, a height of 20.5–26.2 mm, and 4.75–5.25 whorls. The body whorl has a slightly compressed or compressed shape and is usually rounded. The early whorls of the shell have a bluish colouration in some individuals. The reflected and simple lip has an ivory, white or peach colouration. A wing-shaped projection at the shell's columellar margin is not pronounced or absent. The shell's colour pattern is generally variable and includes patterns such as zig-zag stripes, spiral lines, spiral bands and transverse lines in different shades of brown. The peripheral band of the shell has usually a dark brown colour.

== Distribution ==
Cyclophorus phongnhakebangensis is only known from Phong Nha-Kẻ Bàng National Park, Vietnam.

== Etymology ==
The name of this species refers to its type locality in Phong Nha-Kẻ Bàng National Park, Vietnam.
