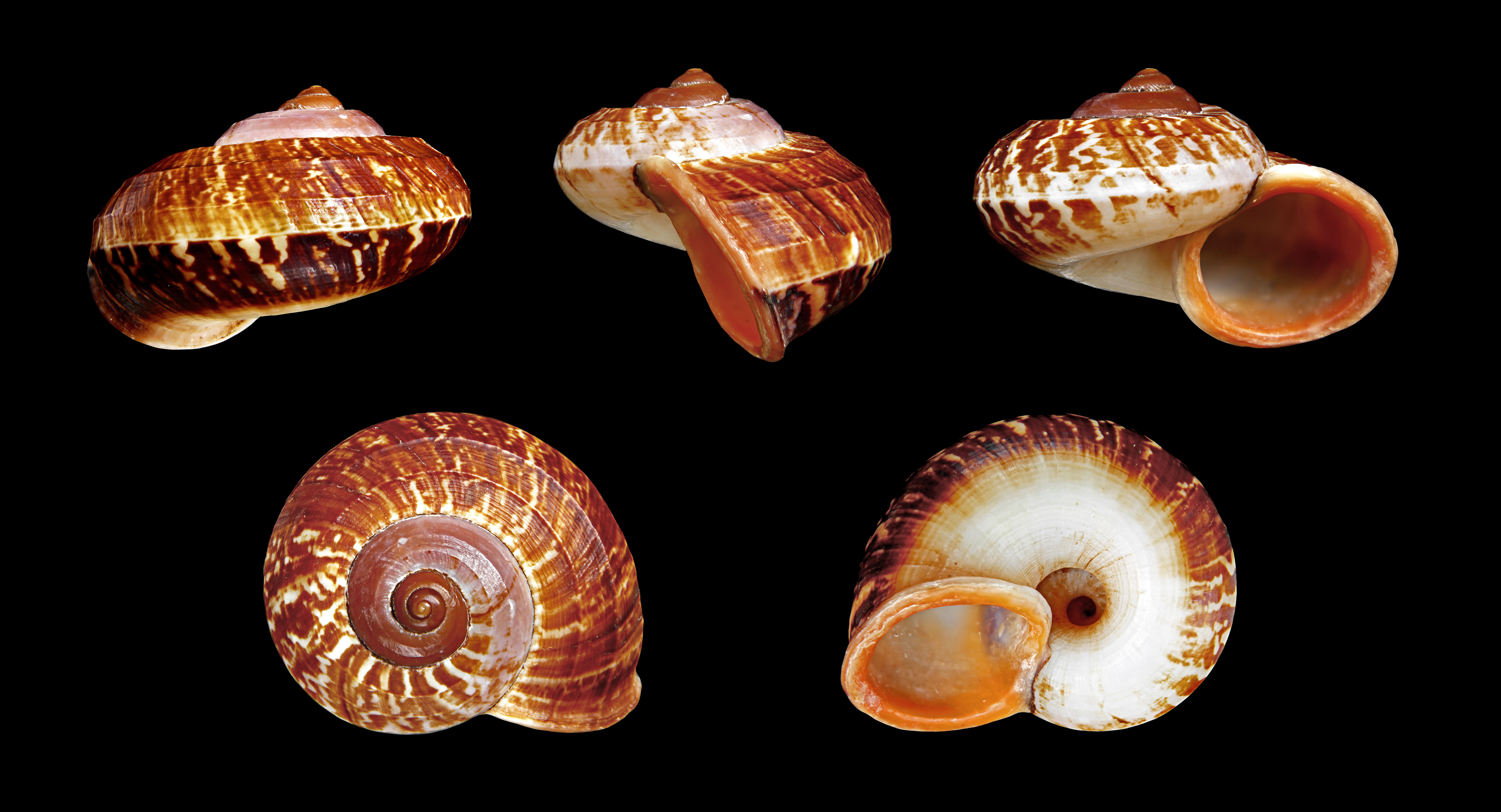
- Five views of a shell identified as Cyclophorus rafflesi

Scientific classification
- Kingdom: Animalia
- Phylum: Mollusca
- Class: Gastropoda
- Subclass: Caenogastropoda
- Order: Architaenioglossa
- Superfamily: Cyclophoroidea
- Family: Cyclophoridae
- Genus: Cyclophorus; Montfort, 1810

Type species
- Helix volvulus O. F. Müller, 1774

Synonyms
- List: Cyclohelix Mörch, 1852; Cyclophorus (Cricophorus) Kobelt & Möllendorff, 1897; Cyclophorus (Cyclohelix) Mörch, 1852; Cyclophorus (Cyclophorus) Montfort, 1810; Cyclophorus (Eucyclophorus) Möllendorff, 1886; Cyclophorus (Glossostylus) Kobelt & Möllendorff, 1897; Cyclophorus (Kobeltostylus) Egorov, 2006; Cyclophorus (Litostylus) Kobelt & Möllendorff, 1897; Cyclophorus (Salpingophorus) Kobelt & Möllendorff, 1897; Cyclostoma (Cyclophorus) Montfort, 1810; Eucyclophorus Möllendorff, 1886; Litostylus Kobelt & Möllendorff, 1897

= Cyclophorus (gastropod) =

Genus of gastropods

Cyclophorus is a genus of operculate land snails, terrestrial gastropod mollusks in the family Cyclophoridae.

== Selected species ==
Species in the genus Cyclophorus include:

- Cyclophorus aurantiacus (Schumacher, 1817)
- Cyclophorus bensoni L. Pfeiffer, 1852
- Cyclophorus cantori (Benson, 1851)
- Cyclophorus elegans Moellendorff, 1881
- Cyclophorus expansus L. Pfeiffer, 1852
- Cyclophorus fulguratus (L. Pfeiffer, 1852)
- Cyclophorus horridulum (Morelet, 1882)
- Cyclophorus malayanus (Benson, 1852)
- Cyclophorus phongnhakebangensis Oheimb, 2019
- Cyclophorus speciosus (Philippi, 1847)
- Cyclophorus volvulus (O. F. Müller, 1774)
- Cyclophorus zebrinus (Benson, 1836)
