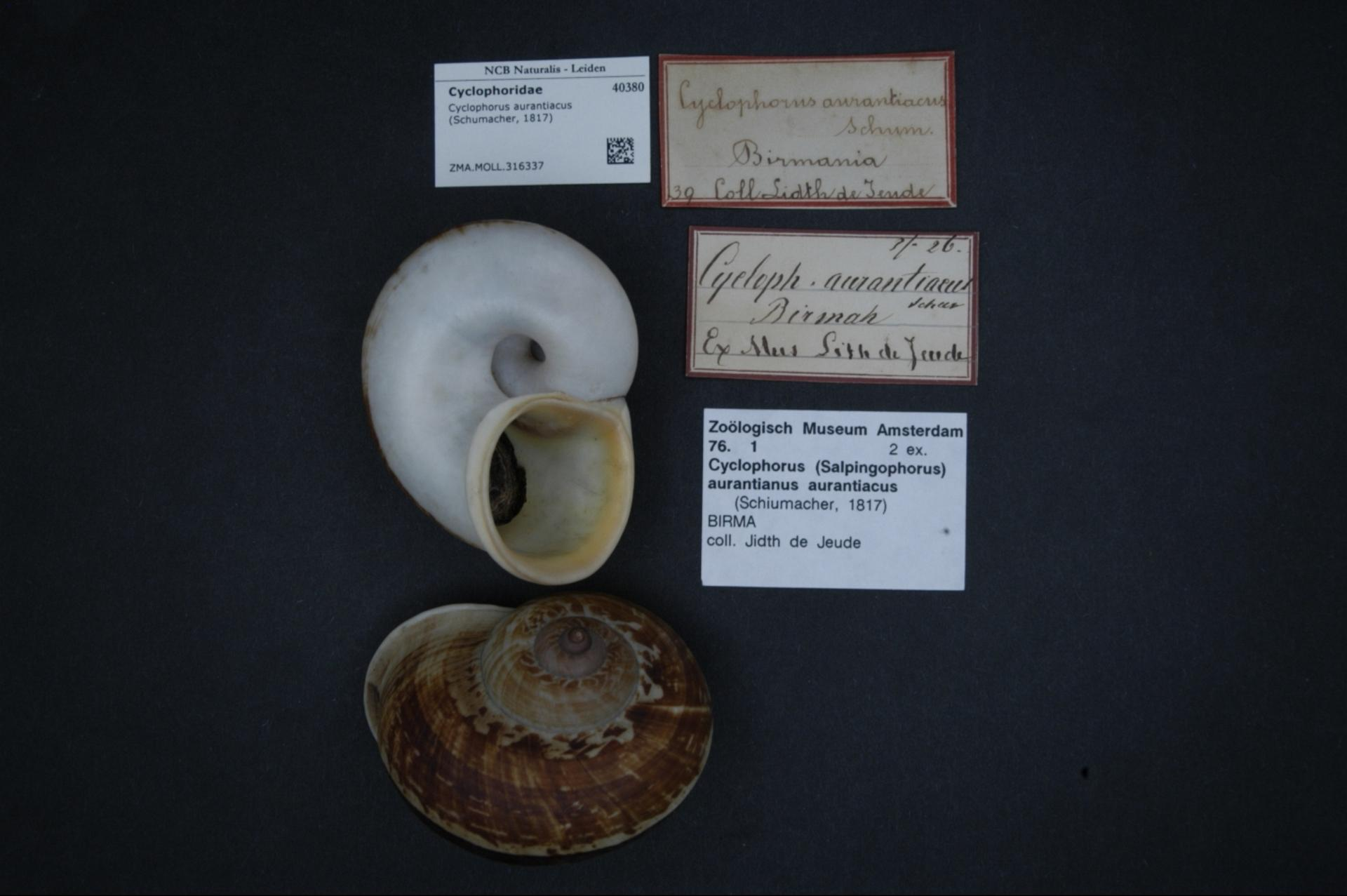

Scientific classification
- Kingdom: Animalia
- Phylum: Mollusca
- Class: Gastropoda
- Subclass: Caenogastropoda
- Order: Architaenioglossa
- Family: Cyclophoridae
- Genus: Cyclophorus
- Species: C. aurantiacus

Binomial name
- Cyclophorus aurantiacus (Schumacher, 1817)

= Cyclophorus aurantiacus =

Species of gastropod

Cyclophorus aurantiacus is a species of gastropod belonging to the family Cyclophoridae.

The species is found in Southeastern Asia. In Thailand, this type of land snail called Hoi hom (Thai: หอยหอม, "fragrant snail") what with they have a fragrant smell when cooked as food, and on that account, they are cooked and eaten as local food in some provinces such as Nakhon Nayok.

Subspecies:

- Cyclophorus aurantiacus pernobilis (Gould, 1843)
