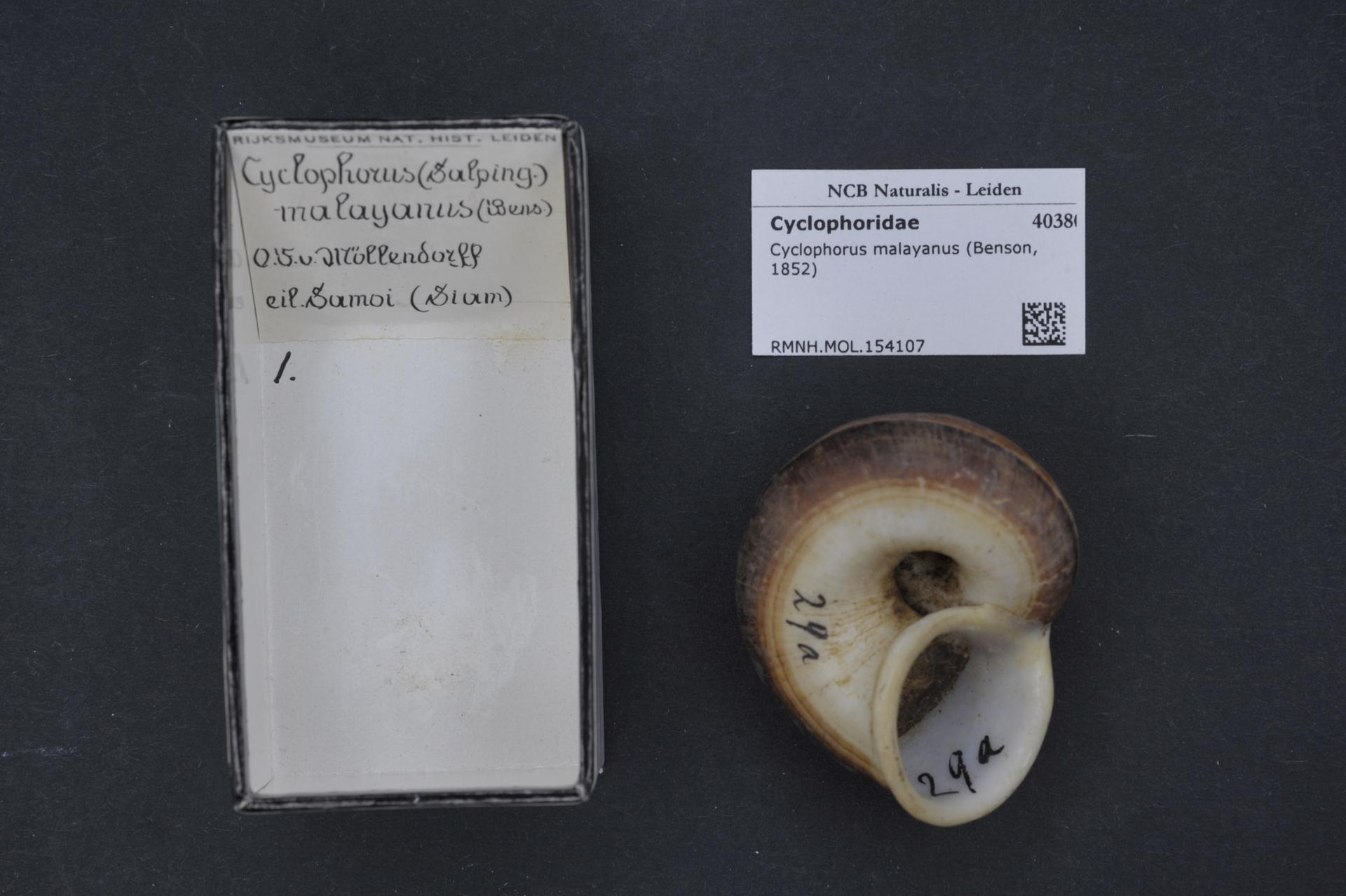

Scientific classification
- Kingdom: Animalia
- Phylum: Mollusca
- Class: Gastropoda
- Subclass: Caenogastropoda
- Order: Architaenioglossa
- Family: Cyclophoridae
- Genus: Cyclophorus
- Species: C. malayanus

Binomial name
- Cyclophorus malayanus (Benson, 1852)

= Cyclophorus malayanus =

Species of gastropod

Cyclophorus malayanus is a species of gastropods belonging to the family Cyclophoridae.

The species is found in Southeastern Asia.
