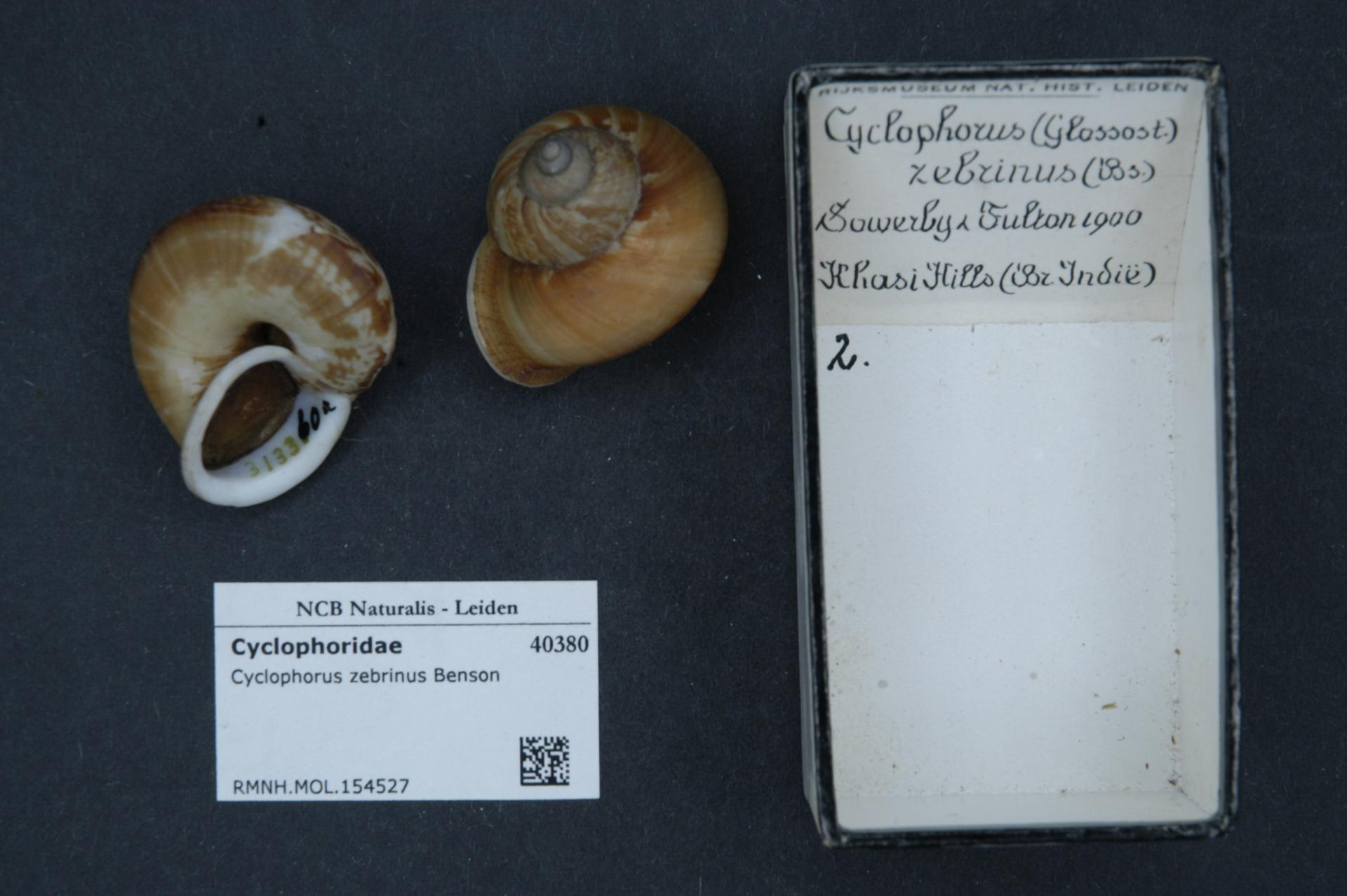

Scientific classification
- Kingdom: Animalia
- Phylum: Mollusca
- Class: Gastropoda
- Subclass: Caenogastropoda
- Order: Architaenioglossa
- Family: Cyclophoridae
- Genus: Cyclophorus
- Species: C. zebrinus

Binomial name
- Cyclophorus zebrinus (Benson, 1836)

= Cyclophorus zebrinus =

Species of gastropod

Cyclophorus zebrinus is a species of gastropods belonging to the family Cyclophoridae.

The species is found in Southern Asia.
