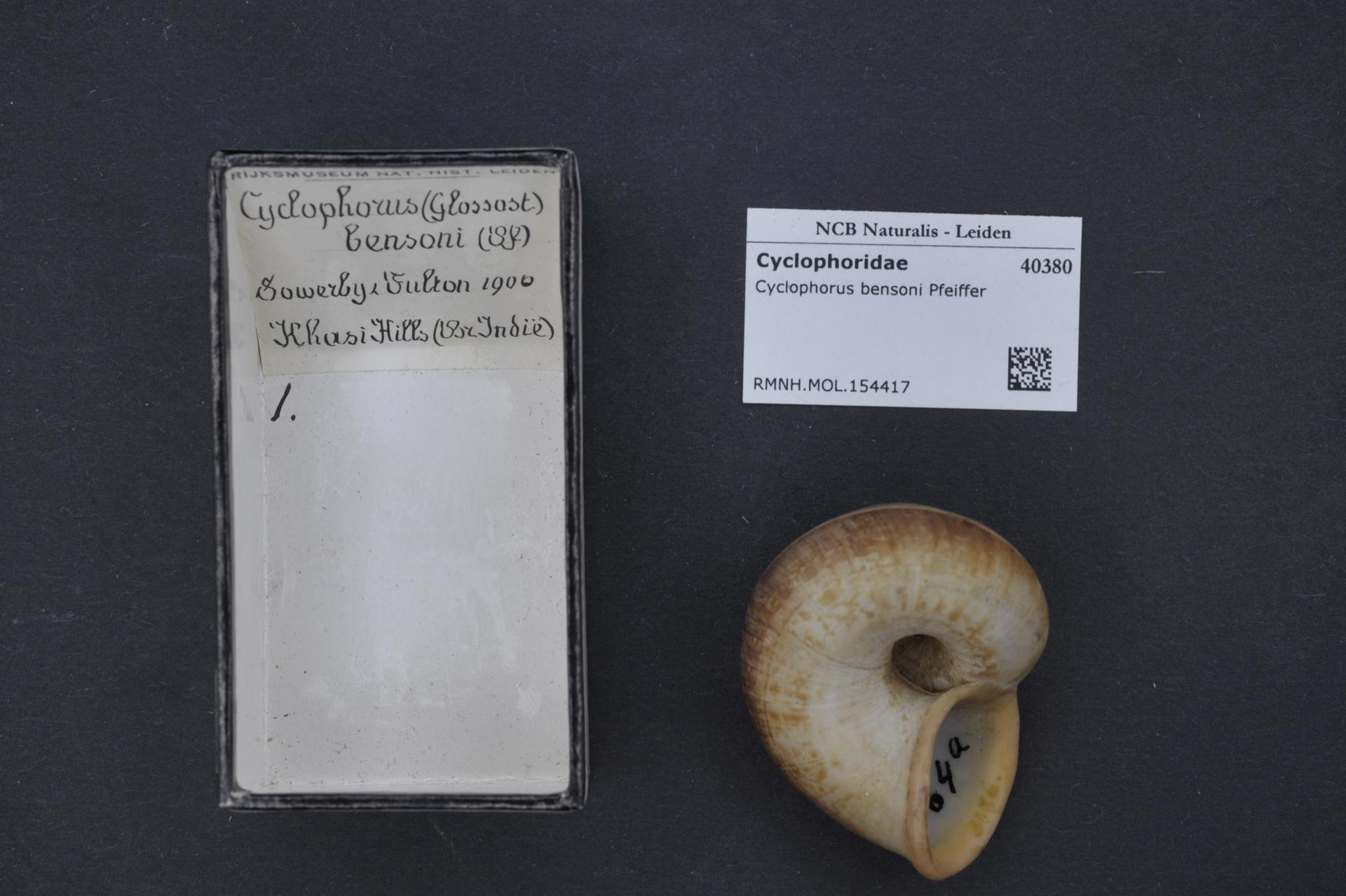
- Specimen collected in 1900 and originally held by the Rijksmuseum van Natuurlijke Historie

Scientific classification
- Kingdom: Animalia
- Phylum: Mollusca
- Class: Gastropoda
- Subclass: Caenogastropoda
- Order: Architaenioglossa
- Family: Cyclophoridae
- Genus: Cyclophorus
- Species: C. bensoni

Binomial name
- Cyclophorus bensoni Pfeiffer, 1852

= Cyclophorus bensoni =

Species of gastropod

Cyclophorus bensoni is a species of gastropods belonging to the family Cyclophoridae. The species is found in Southeastern Asia.
