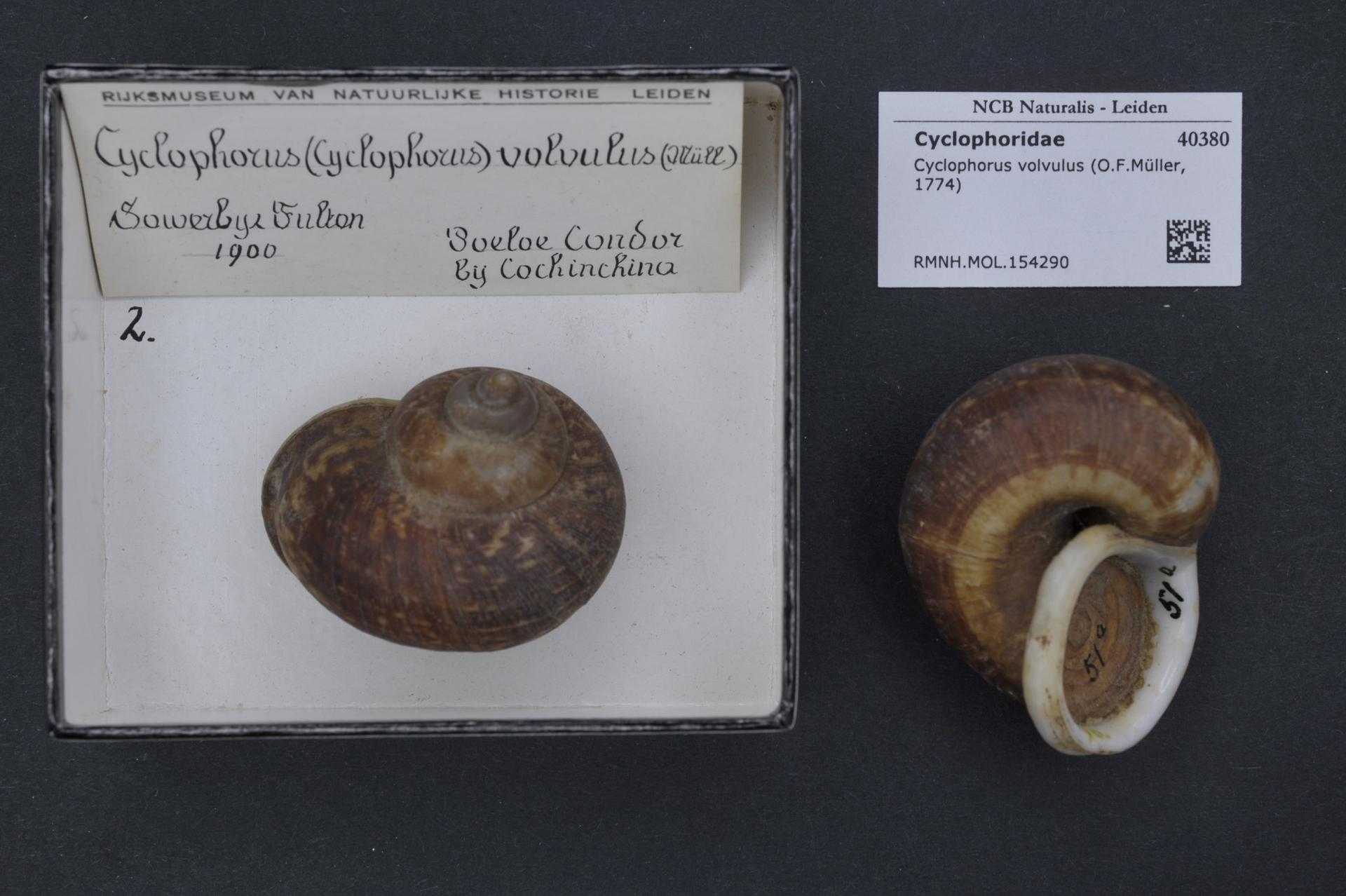

Scientific classification
- Kingdom: Animalia
- Phylum: Mollusca
- Class: Gastropoda
- Subclass: Caenogastropoda
- Order: Architaenioglossa
- Family: Cyclophoridae
- Genus: Cyclophorus
- Species: C. volvulus

Binomial name
- Cyclophorus volvulus (Müller, 1774)

Synonyms
- Helix volvulus Müller, 1774

= Cyclophorus volvulus =

Species of gastropod

Cyclophorus volvulus is a species of gastropods belonging to the family Cyclophoridae.

The species inhabits terrestrial environments.
