= Cyclophorus expansus =

Scientific classification
- Kingdom: Animalia
- Phylum: Mollusca
- Class: Gastropoda
- Subclass: Caenogastropoda
- Order: Architaenioglossa
- Family: Cyclophoridae
- Genus: Cyclophorus
- Species: C. expansus

Binomial name
- Cyclophorus expansus Pfeiffer, 1852

Synonyms
- Cyclophorus pfeifferi Reeve, 1861

Species of gastropod

Cyclophorus expansus is a species of gastropod belonging to the family Cyclophoridae.

The species is found in Southeastern Asia.
