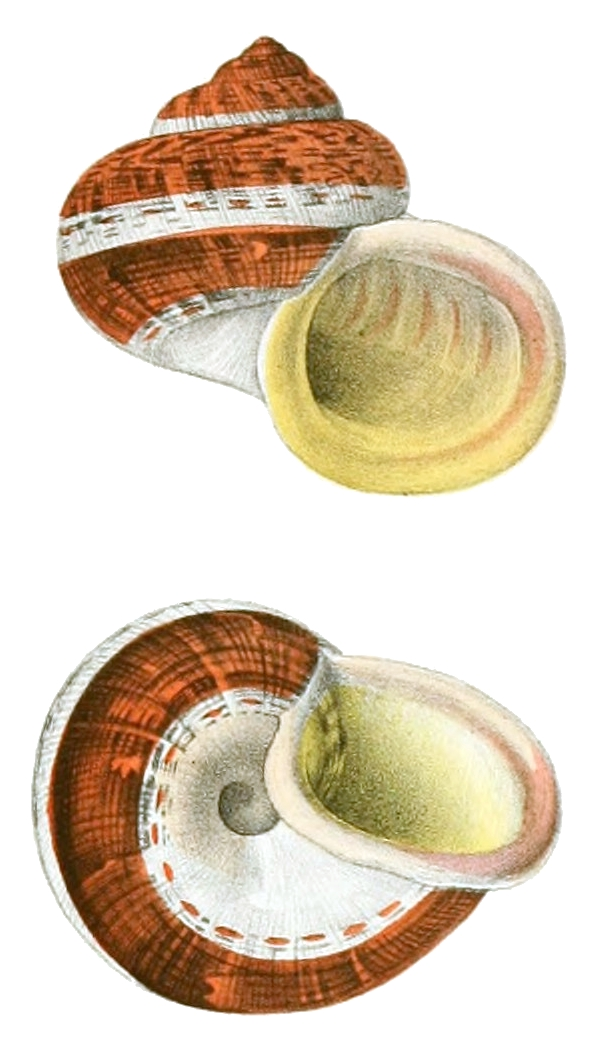
- Drawing of the shell of Cyclophorus fulguratus

Scientific classification
- Kingdom: Animalia
- Phylum: Mollusca
- Class: Gastropoda
- Subclass: Caenogastropoda
- Order: Architaenioglossa
- Family: Cyclophoridae
- Genus: Cyclophorus
- Species: C. fulguratus

Binomial name
- Cyclophorus fulguratus (Pfeiffer, 1852)

= Cyclophorus fulguratus =

Species of gastropod

Cyclophorus fulguratus is a species of small land snail with an operculum, terrestrial pulmonate gastropod mollusc in the family Cyclophoridae.
