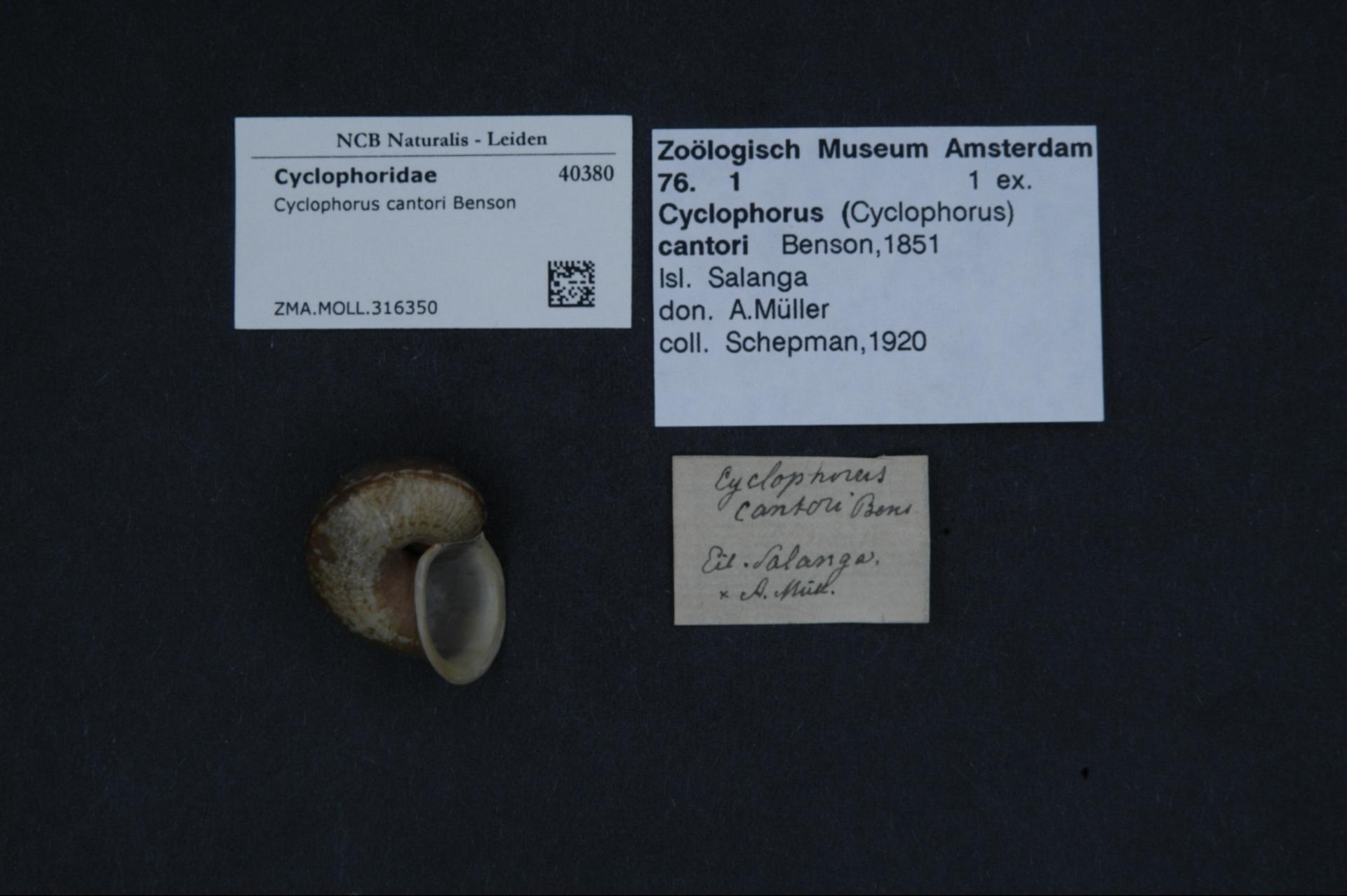

Scientific classification
- Kingdom: Animalia
- Phylum: Mollusca
- Class: Gastropoda
- Subclass: Caenogastropoda
- Order: Architaenioglossa
- Family: Cyclophoridae
- Genus: Cyclophorus
- Species: C. cantori

Binomial name
- Cyclophorus cantori (Benson, 1851)

= Cyclophorus cantori =

Species of gastropod

Cyclophorus cantori is a species of gastropod belonging to the family Cyclophoridae.

The species is found in Southeastern Asia.
