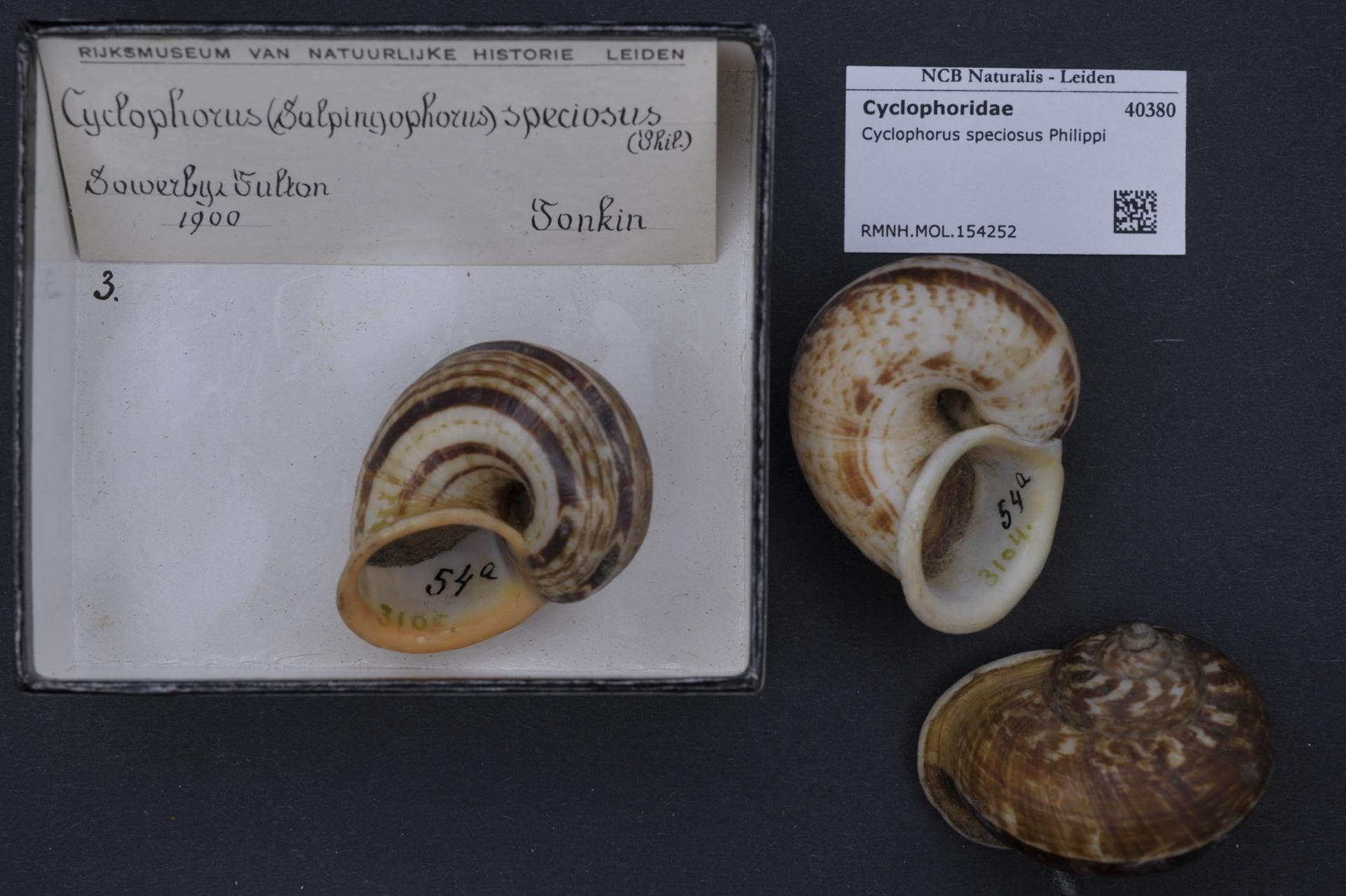

Scientific classification
- Kingdom: Animalia
- Phylum: Mollusca
- Class: Gastropoda
- Subclass: Caenogastropoda
- Order: Architaenioglossa
- Family: Cyclophoridae
- Genus: Cyclophorus
- Species: C. speciosus

Binomial name
- Cyclophorus speciosus (Philippi, 1847)

= Cyclophorus speciosus =

Species of gastropod

Cyclophorus speciosus is a species of gastropods belonging to the family Cyclophoridae.

The species is found in India and Southeastern Asia.
