= List of gastropods described in 2013 =

This list of gastropods described in 2013 is a list of new taxa of snails and slugs of every kind that have been described (following the rules of the ICZN) during the year 2013. The list only includes taxa at the level of genus or species. For changes in taxonomy above the level of genus, see Changes in the taxonomy of gastropods since 2005.

== Fossil gastropods ==
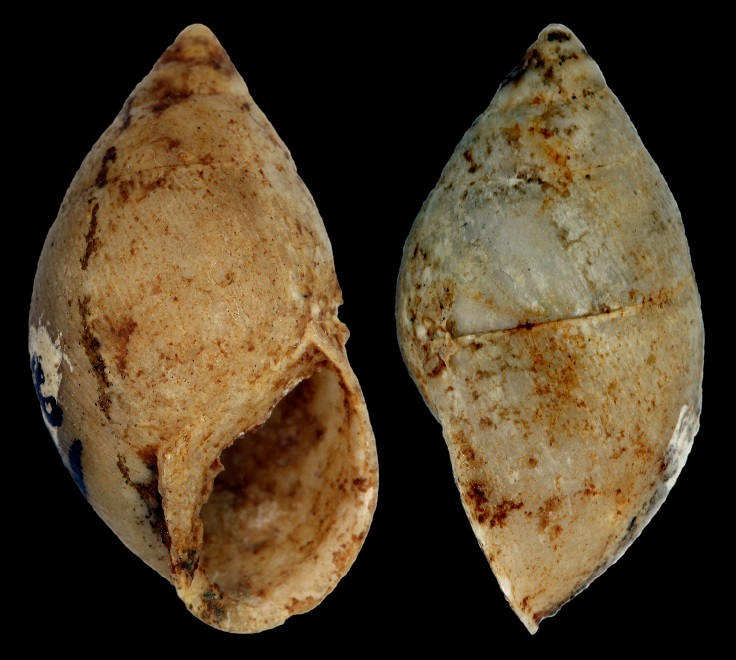
A fossilized shell of Eoborus fusiforme

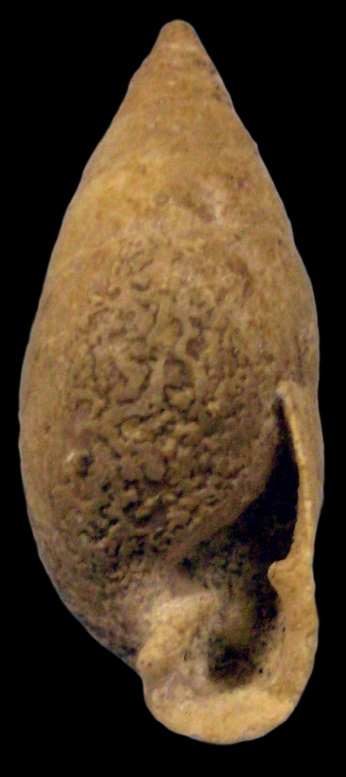
Cortana carvalhoi is the sole species in the genus Cortana

- Anulifera chubutensis Ferrari, 2013
- Architectonica bajaensis Perrilliat, 2013
- Architectonica bieleri Perrilliat, 2013
- Asmunda rebjongensis Robba, 2013
- Bacteridiella saurini Robba, 2013
- Bania obliquaecostata Neubauer, Mandic, Harzhauser & Hrvatović, 2013
- Bartschella karasensis Robba, 2013
- Besla tawunensis Robba, 2013
- Besla unicincta Robba, 2013
- Calyptraphorus terrysmithae Perrilliat, 2013
- Campanile zakhoense Harzhauser, Hoşgör & Pacaud, 2013
- Chrysallida reticulata Robba, 2013
- Colpomphalus spiralocostatus Gründel & Kollmann, 2013
- Costosyrnola rebjongensis Robba, 2013
- Cyclostremiscus petiti Perrilliat, 2013
- Egila garudai Robba, 2013
- Egilina karasensis Robba, 2013
- Eoborus fusiforme Salvador & Simone, 2013
- Eulimella latemarginata Robba, 2013
- Eulimella lawsi Robba, 2013
- Eulimella rembangensis Robba, 2013
- Eunerinea mendozana Cataldo, 2013
- Exesilla langhiana Robba, 2013
- Exesilla striata Robba, 2013
- "Faunus" dominicii Harzhauser, Hoşgör & Pacaud, 2013
- Gastrocopta itaboraiensis Salvador & Simone, 2013
- Koloonella rebjongensis Robba, 2013
- Lacunaria carrenoae Perrilliat, 2013
- Leucotina rebjongensis Robba, 2013
- Levipyrgulina levisculpta Robba, 2013
- Liamorpha minuta Robba, 2013
- Liamorpha rembangensis Robba, 2013
- Linopyrga gradata Robba, 2013
- Linopyrga marcoi Robba, 2013
- Longchaeus schepmani Robba, 2013
- Margarya nanningensis Ying, Fürsich & Schneider, 2013
- Megastomia gradata Robba, 2013
- Megastomia tawunensis Robba, 2013
- Melanopsis corici Neubauer, Mandic, Harzhauser & Hrvatović, 2013
- Melanopsis medinae Neubauer, Mandic, Harzhauser & Hrvatović, 2013
- Menesthella bicarinata Robba, 2013
- Menesthella javanensis Robba, 2013
- Menesthella matteoi Robba, 2013
- Nematurella vrabaci Neubauer, Mandic, Harzhauser & Hrvatović, 2013
- Nisiturris columellaris Robba, 2013
- Nisiturris karasensis Robba, 2013
- Nisiturris obliquecostata Robba, 2013
- Nisiturris piccolii Robba, 2013
- Nisiturris rembangensis Robba, 2013
- Nisiturris supramarginata Robba, 2013

Other taxa:

- genus Alaskodiscus Rohr, Frýda & Blodgett, 2013
- genus Angulathilda Gründel & Nützel, 2013
- genus Bleytonella Gründel & Kollmann, 2013
- genus Brouzetdiscus Gründel & Kollmann, 2013
- genus Bulicingulina Robba, 2013
- genus Bulimoscilla Robba, 2013
- genus Cimrmaniela Frýda, Ferrová & Frýdová, 2013
- genus Cortana Salvador & Simone, 2013
- genus Costatomphalus Gründel & Kollmann, 2013
- genus Cyclothyrella Neubauer, Mandic, Harzhauser & Hrvatović, 2013
- genus Darwinices Griffin & Pastorino, 2013
- genus Macromargarya Ying, Fürsich & Schneider, 2013
- genus Nisipyrgiscus Robba, 2013

== Marine gastropods ==
- Aeneator martae Araya, 2013
- Aidemofusus ignotus Kosyan & Kantor, 2013
- Alaginella aikeni Lussi, 2013
- Anna capixaba Coltro & Dornellas, 2013
- Assiminea principensis Rolán, 2013
- Assiminea moroccoensis Rolán, 2013
- Assiminea occulta Rolán, 2013
- Assiminea saotomensis Rolán, 2013
- Assiminea senegalensis Rolán, 2013
- Buchema schearmani Morassi & Bonfitto, 2013
- Dalliconus coletteae Petuch, 2013
- Darioconus natalaurantia Veldsman, 2013
- Chicoreus janae Houart, 2013
- Crassispira somalica Morassi & Bonfitto, 2013
- Dauciconus jorioi Petuch, 2013
- Dermomurex coonsorum Petuch, 2013
- Extractrix dockeryi Harasewych & Petit, 2013
- Enaeta bessei Petuch, 2013
- Enaeta lindae Petuch, 2013
- Engina dicksoni Petuch, 2013
- Haplocochlias lupita Espinosa & Ortea, 2013
- Haustellum lorenzi Houart, 2013
- Iredalea adensis Morassi & Bonfitto, 2013
- Jaspidiconus allamandi Petuch, 2013
- Jaspidiconus exumaensis Petuch, 2013
- Jaspidiconus mackintoshi Petuch, 2013
- Jaspidiconus oleiniki Petuch, 2013
- Jaspidiconus sargenti Petuch, 2013
- Lindaconus therriaulti Petuch, 2013
- Magelliconus eleutheraensis Petuch, 2013
- Marginella adamsoides Lussi, 2013
- Marginella kilburni Lussi, 2013
- Marginella philipi Veldsman, 2013
- Marginella richardsbayensis Lussi, 2013
- Marginella tentoria Lussi, 2013
- Marginella viljoenae Veldsman, 2013
- Marginella wallaceorum Lussi, 2013
- Modulus hennequini Petuch, 2013
- Modulus honkerorum Petuch,2013
- Murexiella deynzerorum Petuch, 2013
- Muricopsis honkeri Petuch, 2013
- Nassarius levis Abbate & Cavallari, 2013
- Nassarius madurensis Kool, 2013
- Isotriphora tigrina Fernandes, Pimenta & Leal, 2013
- Isotriphora onca Fernandes, Pimenta & Leal, 2013
- Oliva mooreana Petuch, 2013
- Ovini petalius Simone, 2013
- Phaenomenella vexabilis Fraussen & Stahlschmidt, 2013
- Pictorium versicolor Strong & Bouchet, 2013
- Planaxis nancyae Petuch, 2013
- Pollia krauseri Tröndlé, 2013
- Polygona bessei Petuch, 2013
- Polygona paulae Petuch, 2013
- Pustulatirus biocellatus Lyons & Snyder, 2013
- Pustulatirus utilaensis Lyons & Snyder, 2013
- Pustulatirus watermanorum Lyons & Snyder, 2013
- Pusula bessei Petuch, 2013
- Roquesia lindae Petuch, 2013
- Sandericonus ednae Petuch, 2013
- Stramonita buchecki Petuch, 2013
- Terebra vappereaui Tröndlé, Boutet & Terryn, 2013
- Thala turneri Salisbury & Gori, 2013
- Tropidoturris viccondei Morassi & Bonfitto, 2013
- Vexillum beitzi Salisbury & Gori, 2013
- Vexillum oteroi Salisbury & Gori, 2013
- Vexillum spiculum Bozzetti, 2013
- Volutopsius scotiae Fraussen, McKay, & Drewery, 2013
- Zemiropsis demertziae Fraussen & Rosado, 2013

=== Other taxa ===
New genera

- Americoliva Petuch, 2013
- Arubaconus Petuch, 2013
- Attenuiconus Petuch, 2013
- Bermudaconus Petuch, 2013
- Brasiliconus Petuch, 2013
- Coltroconus Petuch, 2013
- Kellyconus Petuch, 2013
- Ovini Simone, 2013
- Poremskiconus Petuch, 2013
- Roquesia Petuch, 2013
- Sandericonus Petuch, 2013
- Tuckericonus Petuch, 2013

New subspecies

- Cinctura hunteria keatonorum Petuch, 2013
- Fulguropsis spiratum keysensis Petuch, 2013
- Globivasum globulus whincheri Petuch, 2013
- Macrocypraea cervus lindseyi Petuch, 2013
- Harpa major ivojardai Cossignani, 2013
- Fusinus tuberculatus priscai Bozzetti, 2013
- Oliva circinata jorioi Petuch, 2013
- Rhizoconus pertusus elodieallaryae Cossignani, 2013

== Freshwater gastropods ==
- Belgrandiella maarensis Georgiev, 2013
- Bithynia bensoni Glöer & Bössneck, 2013
- Bithynia ghodaghodiensis Glöer & Bössneck, 2013
- Bithynia prestoni Glöer & Bössneck, 2013
- Bithynia raptiensis Glöer & Bössneck, 2013
- Bithynia reharensis Glöer & Bössneck, 2013
- Bithynia subbaraoi Glöer & Bössneck, 2013
- Bosnidilhia vreloana Boeters, Glöer & Pešić, 2013
- Bythinella blidariensis Glöer, 2013
- Bythinella falniowskii Glöer, 2013
- Bythinella feheri Glöer, 2013
- Bythinella georgievi Glöer, 2013
- Bythinella rilaensis Georgiev & Glöer, 2013
- Bythinella sirbui Glöer, 2013
- Bythinella szarowskae Glöer, 2013
- Bythiospeum bechevi Georgiev & Glöer, 2013
- Bythiospeum devetakium Georgiev & Glöer, 2013
- Bythiospeum jazzi Georgiev & Glöer, 2013
- Bythiospeum kolevi Georgiev, 2013
- Bythiospeum simovi Georgiev, 2013
- Bythiospeum stoyanovi Georgiev, 2013
- Grossuana derventica Georgiev & Glöer, 2013
- Grossuana slavyanica Georgiev & Glöer, 2013
- Gyraulus egirdirensis Glöer & Girod, 2013
- Gyraulus elenae Vinarski, Glöer & Palatov, 2013
- Gyraulus kosiensis Glöer & Bössneck, 2013
- Gyraulus luguhuensis Shu, Köhler, Fu & Wang, 2013
- Gyraulus taseviensis Glöer & Girod, 2013
- Isimerope semele Radea & Parmakelis in Radea, Parmakelis, Mourikis & Triantis, 2013
- Islamia dmitroviciana Boeters, Glöer & Pešić, 2013
- Karucia sublacustrina Pešić & Glöer, 2013
- Moitessieria racamondi Callot-Girardi, 2013
- Moitessieria ripacurtiae Tarruella, Corbella, Guillén, Prats & Alba, 2013
- Pontobelgrandiella tanevi Georgiev, 2013
- Pyrgulopsis licina Hershler, Liu & Bradford, 2013
- Pyrgulopsis perforata Hershler, Liu & Bradford, 2013
- Pyrgulopsis sanchezi Hershler, Liu & Bradford, 2013
- Radomaniola feheri Georgiev, 2013
- Radomaniola strandzhica Georgiev & Glöer, 2013
- Strandzhia bythinellopenia Georgiev & Glöer, 2013

Other taxa

- Subfamily Radicinae Vinarski, 2013
- Genus Bosnidilhia Boeters, Glöer & Pešić, 2013
- Genus Isimerope Radea & Parmakelis in Radea, Parmakelis, Mourikis & Triantis, 2013
- Genus Karucia Pešić & Glöer, 2013
- Genus Montenegrospeum Pešić & Glöer, 2013
- Genus Strandzhia Georgiev & Glöer, 2013
- Subgenus Margarya (Mabillemargarya) He, 2013
- Subgenus Margarya (Tchangmargarya) He, 2013

== Land gastropods ==
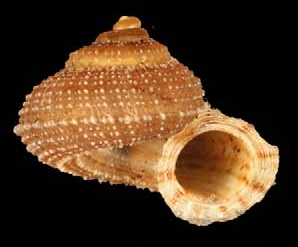
An empty shell of Abbottella calliotropis described by G. Thomas Waters

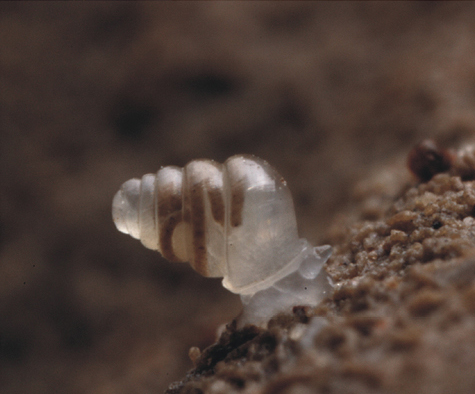
A live individual of Zospeum tholussum discovered in 2013, deep in Lukina Jama–Trojama cave system in Croatia

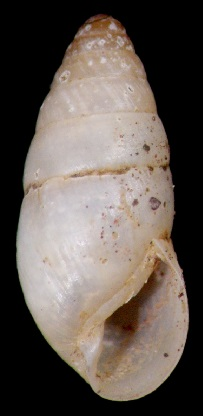
An empty shell of Vegrandinia trindadensis, type species of the genus Vegrandinia described by Brazilian malacologists Rodrigo B. Salvador, Luiz R. L. Simone and Carlo M. Cunha

- Abbottella calliotropis Watters, 2013
- Abbottella diadema Watters, 2013
- Abbottella dichroa Watters, 2013
- Abbottella nitens Watters, 2013
- Abbottella paradoxa Watters, 2013
- Abbottella tenebrosa Watters, 2013
- Afripupa misaliensis Gittenberger & van Bruggen, 2013
- Alopia hirschfelderi Nordsieck, 2013
- Amphidromus iunior Cilia, 2013
- Anctus prolatus Simone & Casati, 2013
- Arinia maolanensis Zhang, Chen & Zhou, 2013
- Arnhemtrachia ramingining Köhler & Criscione, 2013
- Atlasica cossignanii Ahuir Galindo, 2013
- Australdonta anneae Sartori, Gargominy & Fontaine, 2013
- Australdonta florencei Sartori, Gargominy & Fontaine, 2013
- Australdonta oheatora Sartori, Gargominy & Fontaine, 2013
- Australdonta pakalolo Sartori, Gargominy & Fontaine, 2013
- Australdonta sibleti Sartori, Gargominy & Fontaine, 2013
- Australdonta teaae Sartori, Gargominy & Fontaine, 2013
- Australocosmica rotunda Criscione & Köhler, 2013
- Australocosmica pallida Criscione & Köhler, 2013
- Australocosmica buffonensis Criscione & Köhler, 2013
- Australocosmica bernoulliensis Criscione & Köhler, 2013
- Australocosmica crassicostata Criscione & Köhler, 2013
- Australocosmica nana Criscione & Köhler, 2013
- Avakubia biokoensis de Winter & Vastenhout, 2013
- Avakubia crystallum de Winter in de Winter & Vastenhout, 2013
- Avakubia fruticicola de Winter & Vastenhout, 2013
- Avakubia occidentalis de Winter in de Winter & Vastenhout, 2013
- Avakubia ortizdezarateorum de Winter & Vastenhout, 2013
- Avakubia semenguei de Winter & Vastenhout, 2013
- Avakubia subacuminata de Winter & Vastenhout, 2013
- Cahuillus fultoni Gilbertson, Eernisse & Wallace, 2013
- Clausilia brembina alanica Nordsieck, 2013
- Clausilia umbrosa gardonensis Nardi & Nordsieck, 2013
- Clinispira insolita Simone & Casati, 2013
- Cyclodontina capivara Simone & Casati, 2013
- Dadagulella browni mafiensis Rowson & Tattersfield, 2013
- Dadagulella browni semulikiensis Rowson & Tattersfield, 2013
- Dadagulella cresswelli Rowson & Tattersfield, 2013
- Dadagulella delta Rowson & Tattersfield, 2013
- Dadagulella ecclesiola Rowson & Tattersfield, 2013
- Dadagulella frontierarum Rowson & Tattersfield, 2013
- Dadagulella minareta Rowson & Tattersfield, 2013
- Dadagulella minuscula mahorana Rowson & Tattersfield, 2013
- Dadagulella pembensis Rowson & Tattersfield, 2013
- Denhamiana laetifica Stanisic, 2013
- Denhamiana leichhardti Stanisic, 2013
- Diplommatina insularis Tongkerd & Panha in Tongkerd, Sutcharit & Panha, 2013
- Drusia alexantoni Martínez-Ortí & Borredà, 2013
- Elia novorossica nagolnica Balashov, 2013
- Euglandina irakita Jardim, Abbate & Simone, 2013
- Gastrocopta sp. CW1 (nomen nudum)
- Gudeodiscus concavus Páll-Gergely in Páll-Gergely & Hunyadi, 2013
- Gudeodiscus emigrans otanii Páll-Gergely in Páll-Gergely & Hunyadi, 2013
- Gudeodiscus emigrans quadrilamellatus Páll-Gergely in Páll-Gergely & Hunyadi, 2013
- Gudeodiscus eroessi eroessi Páll-Gergely & Hunyadi, 2013
- Gudeodiscus eroessi fuscus Páll-Gergely & Hunyadi, 2013
- Gudeodiscus eroessi hemisculptus Páll-Gergely in Páll-Gergely & Hunyadi, 2013
- Gudeodiscus giardi oharai Páll-Gergely in Páll-Gergely & Hunyadi, 2013
- Gudeodiscus giardi szekeresi Páll-Gergely & Hunyadi, 2013
- Gudeodiscus goliath Páll-Gergely & Hunyadi, 2013
- Gudeodiscus okuboi Páll-Gergely & Hunyadi, 2013
- Gudeodiscus phlyarius werneri Páll-Gergely & Hunyadi, 2013
- Gudeodiscus pulvinaris robustus Páll-Gergely & Hunyadi, 2013
- Gudeodiscus soosi Páll-Gergely in Páll-Gergely & Hunyadi, 2013
- Gudeodiscus ursula Páll-Gergely & Hunyadi, 2013
- Gudeodiscus yanghaoi Páll-Gergely & Hunyadi, 2013
- Gudeodiscus yunnanensis Páll-Gergely in Páll-Gergely & Hunyadi, 2013
- Gyliotrachela phoca Tongkerd & Panha in Tongkerd, Sutcharit & Panha, 2013
- Habeas corpus Simone, 2013
- Habeas data Simone, 2013
- Habeas priscus Simone, 2013
- Hungerfordia echinata echinata Yamazaki & Ueshima in Yamazaki, Yamazaki & Ueshima, 2013
- Hungerfordia echinata tubulispina Yamazaki & Ueshima in Yamazaki, Yamazaki & Ueshima, 2013
- Hungerfordia elegantissima Yamazaki & Ueshima in Yamazaki, Yamazaki & Ueshima, 2013
- Hungerfordia expansilabris Yamazaki & Ueshima in Yamazaki, Yamazaki & Ueshima, 2013
- Hungerfordia goniobasis dmasechensis Yamazaki & Ueshima in Yamazaki, Yamazaki & Ueshima, 2013
- Hungerfordia goniobasis goniobasis Yamazaki & Ueshima in Yamazaki, Yamazaki & Ueshima, 2013
- Hungerfordia nudicollum Yamazaki & Ueshima in Yamazaki, Yamazaki & Ueshima, 2013
- Hungerfordia papilio papilio Yamazaki & Ueshima in Yamazaki, Yamazaki & Ueshima, 2013
- Hungerfordia papilio stenoptera Yamazaki & Ueshima in Yamazaki, Yamazaki & Ueshima, 2013
- Hungerfordia pteropurpuroides Yamazaki & Ueshima in Yamazaki, Yamazaki & Ueshima, 2013
- Hungerfordia subalata Yamazaki & Ueshima in Yamazaki, Yamazaki & Ueshima, 2013
- Hungerfordia triplochilus Yamazaki & Ueshima in Yamazaki, Yamazaki & Ueshima, 2013
- Iberus calaensis Ahuir Galindo, 2013
- Landouria omphalostoma Páll-Gergely & Hunyadi in Páll-Gergely, Hunyadi & Asami, 2013
- Leiabbottella thompsoni Watters, 2013
- Loxana ksibaensis Ahuir Galindo, 2013
- Megalobulimus florezi
- Metafruticicola crassicosta Bank, Gittenberger & Neubert, 2013
- Metafruticicola monticola Bank, Gittenberger & Neubert, 2013
- Metafruticicola nicosiana maasseni Bank, Gittenberger & Neubert, 2013
- Metafruticicola ottmari Bank, Gittenberger & Neubert, 2013
- Metafruticicola pieperi Bank, Gittenberger & Neubert, 2013
- Metafruticicola rugosissima Bank, Gittenberger & Neubert, 2013
- Metafruticicola uluborluensis Bank, Gittenberger & Neubert, 2013
- Microcystina rowsoni Gittenberger & van Bruggen, 2013
- Minidonta bieleri Sartori, Gargominy & Fontaine, 2013
- Minidonta boucheti Sartori, Gargominy & Fontaine, 2013
- Nanotrachia carinata Köhler & Criscione, 2013
- Nanotrachia coronata Köhler & Criscione, 2013ref name=Koehler/>
- Nanotrachia costulata Köhler & Criscione, 2013
- Nanotrachia levis Köhler & Criscione, 2013
- Napaeus doloresae Santana in Santana, Artiles, Yanes, Deniz, Alonso & Ibáñez, 2013
- Napaeus estherae Artiles in Santana, Artiles, Yanes, Deniz, Alonso & Ibáñez, 2013
- Napaeus magnus Yanes, Deniz, Alonso & Ibáñez in Santana, Artiles, Yanes, Deniz, Alonso & Ibáñez, 2013
- Nesiocina abdoui Richling & Bouchet, 2013
- Nesiocina gambierensis Richling & Bouchet, 2013
- Nesiocina grohi Richling & Bouchet, 2013
- Nesiocina mangarevae Richling & Bouchet, 2013
- Nesiocina pauciplicata Richling & Bouchet, 2013
- Nesiocina pazi Richling & Bouchet, 2013
- Nesiocina superoperculata Richling & Bouchet, 2013
- Nesiocina trilamellata Richling & Bouchet, 2013
- Nesiocina unilamellata Richling & Bouchet, 2013
- Nodulabium solidum Criscione & Köhler, 2013
- Omphalotropis ilapiryensis Pearce & Paustian, 2013
- Ototrachia compressa Criscione & Köhler, 2013
- Oxychilus viridescens Martins, Brito & Backeljau, 2013
- Oxychona maculata Salvador & Cavallari, 2013
- Papillifera solida diabolina Nordsieck, 2013
- Papillifera solida pseudobidens Nordsieck, 2013
- Pearsonia tembatensis Marzuki & Clements, 2013

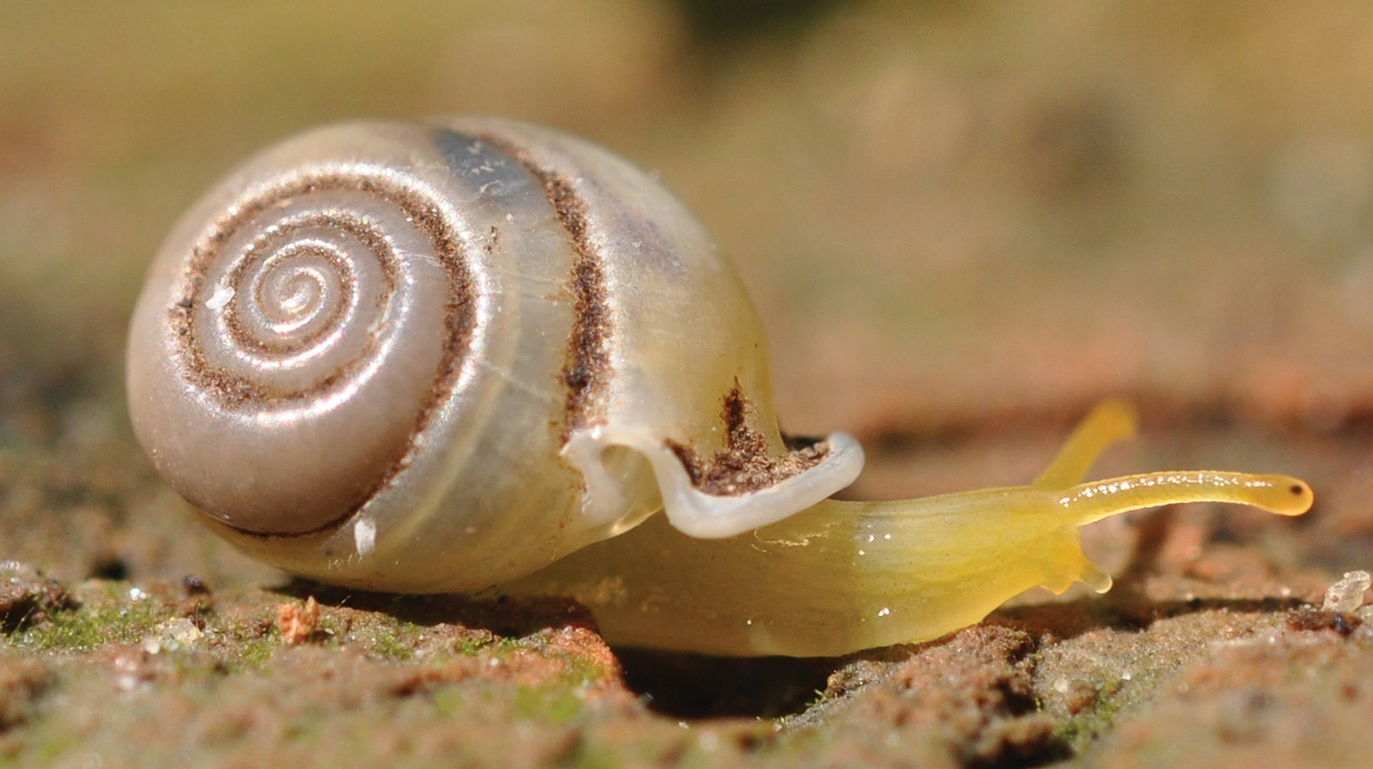
Perrottetia aquilonaria

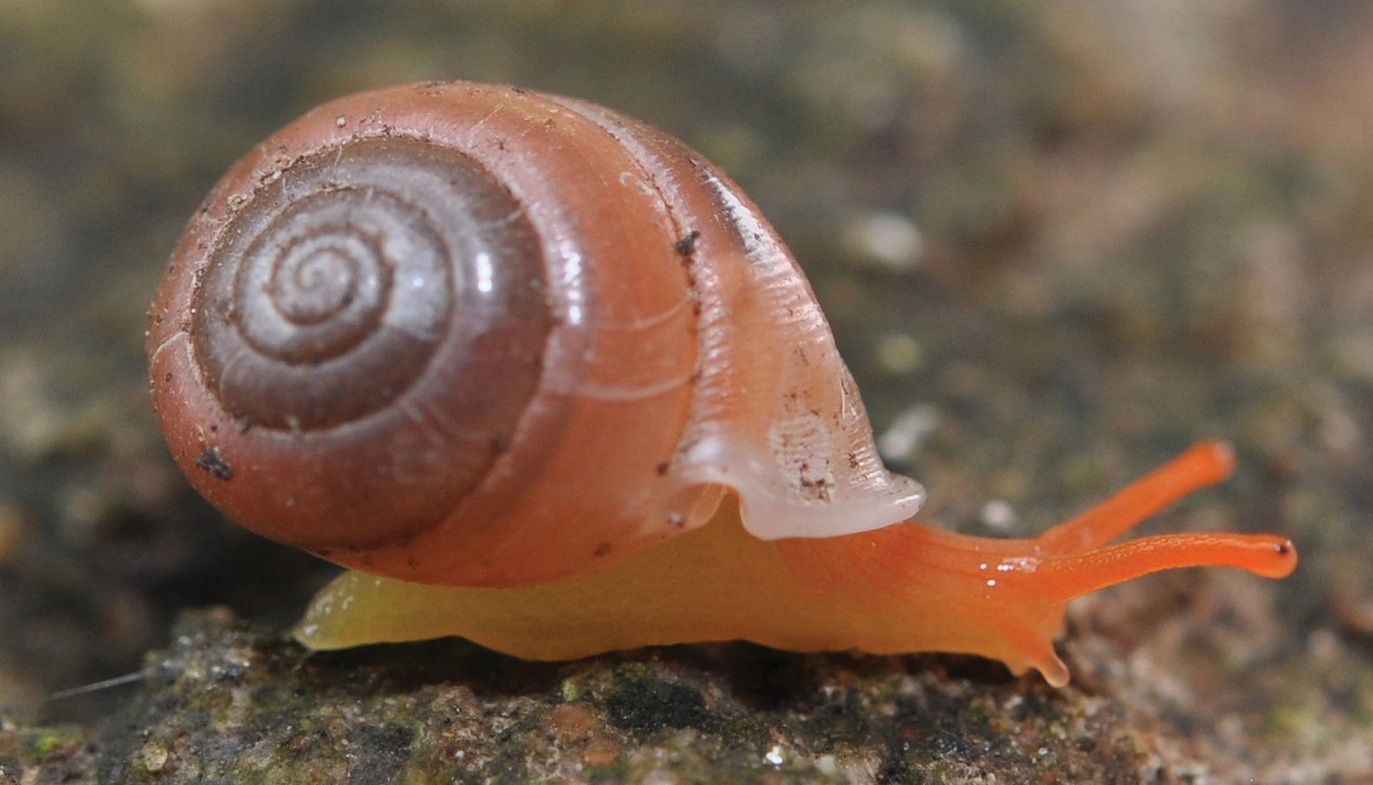
Perrottetia dermapyrrhosa

- Perrottetia aquilonaris Siriboon & Panha in Siriboon, Sutcharit, Naggs & Panha, 2013
- Perrottetia dermapyrrhosa Siriboon & Panha in Siriboon, Sutcharit, Naggs & Panha, 2013
- Perrottetia phuphamanensis Siriboon & Panha in Siriboon, Sutcharit, Naggs & Panha, 2013
- Petraeomastus qii Wang & Wu, 2013
- Platyla jordai Altaba, 2013
- Pollicaria mouhoti monochroma Kongim, Sutcharit, Naggs & Panha, 2013
- Pseudavakubia atewaensis de Winter in de Winter & Vastenhout, 2013
- Pseudavakubia majus de Winter & Vastenhout, 2013
- Pseudavakubia ghanaensis de Winter in de Winter & Vastenhout, 2013
- Pseudavakubia liberiana de Winter in de Winter & Vastenhout, 2013
- Pseudomesodontrachia gregoriana Criscione & Köhler, 2013
- Pupisoma misaliensis Gittenberger & van Bruggen, 2013
- Rhinus gilbertus Simone & Casati, 2013
- Schileykula maculata Páll-Gergely & Asami, 2013
- Serina denticulata Wu & Xu, 2013
- Serina schileykoi Fang & Wu, 2013
- Siciliaria vulcanica sigridae Nordsieck, 2013
- Sicradiscus feheri Páll-Gergely & Hunyadi, 2013
- Sicradiscus transitus Páll-Gergely, 2013
- Sinicola asamiana Páll-Gergely, 2013
- Sinicola schmackeri Páll-Gergely, 2013
- Sinicola stenomphala Páll-Gergely & Hunyadi, 2013
- Sinoennea stunensis Dumrongrojwattana & Wongkamhaeng, 2013
- Stephacharopa calderaensis Miquel & Araya, 2013
- Streptartemon molaris Simone & Casati, 2013
- Sturanya makaroaensis Richling & Bouchet, 2013
- Truncatellina bhutanensis
- Vertigo marciae Nekola & Rosenberg, 2013
- Vitrea saboorii Neubert & Bössneck, 2013
- Zospeum tholussum Weigand, 2013

Other taxa

- Genus Clinispira Simone & Casati, 2013
- Genus Dadagulella Rowson & Tattersfield, 2013
- Genus Denhamiana Stanisic, 2013
- Genus Gudeodiscus Páll-Gergely in Páll-Gergely & Hunyadi, 2013
- Genus Habeas Simone, 2013
- Genus Nanotrachia Köhler & Criscione, 2013
- Genus Nesiocina Richling & Bouchet, 2013
- Genus Nodulabium Criscione & Köhler, 2013
- Genus Ototrachia Criscione & Köhler, 2013
- Genus Pseudavakubia de Winter & Vastenhout, 2013
- Genus Pseudomesodontrachia Criscione & Köhler, 2013
- Genus Sicradiscus Páll-Gergely, 2013
- Genus Stephacharopa Miquel & Araya, 2013
- Genus Vegrandinia Salvador, Cunha & Simone, 2013
- Genus Vincentrachia Criscione & Köhler, 2013
- Subgenus Orcula (Hausdorfia) Páll-Gergely & Irikov in Páll-Gergely, Deli, Irikov & Harl, 2013
- Subgenus Orcula (Illyriobanatica) Páll-Gergely & Deli in Páll-Gergely, Deli, Irikov & Harl, 2013
- Subgenus Metafruticicola (Rothifruticicola) Bank, Gittenberger & Neubert, 2013

== See also ==
- List of gastropods described in 2012
- List of gastropods described in 2014
