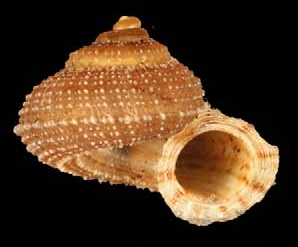
- Apertural view of a shell of Abbottella calliotropis

Scientific classification
- Kingdom: Animalia
- Phylum: Mollusca
- Class: Gastropoda
- Subclass: Caenogastropoda
- Order: Littorinimorpha
- Family: Pomatiidae
- Subfamily: Annulariinae
- Genus: Abbottella; Henderson & Bartsch, 1920

Diversity
- 26 species

= Abbottella =

Genus of gastropods

Abbottella is a genus of operculate land snails, terrestrial gastropod mollusks gastropod in the family Pomatiidae.

The generic name Abbottella is in honor of Dr. Isabella Abbott.

== Distribution ==
The distribution of Abbottella includes Cuba (one species Abbottella decolorata in Guantánamo, the easternmost point on Cuba) and Hispaniola (all other species). Abbottella species are a highly endemic group of land snails living in Hispaniola with a single species in eastern Cuba. Most are known chiefly from Puerto Plata to the Samaná Peninsula in the Cordillera Septentrional that forms the northern coast of the Dominican Republic. A second, lowland group occupies the easternmost portion of the island from the coast west to Santo Domingo. A few puzzling outliers occur at Isla Beata and near Thomazeau, Haiti. Many species are known only from the type locality, or from an unknown locality, and thus their actual distributions remain unclear.

Abbottella and its relatives appear to have evolved on mainland Hispaniola, and thus were not part of the Tiburon Peninsula species assemblage that was tectonically rafted to the island. Preliminary radular and phylogenetic studies clearly indicate that Abbottella and its relatives are a distinct monophyletic group apart from the rest of the Annulariidae.

== Description ==
The genus was described by John Brooks Henderson Jr. and by Paul Bartsch in 1920. Their description reads as follows:

Shell depressed, helicoid, marked by axial ribs between which finer wavy axial threads are present. The spiral sculpture consist of obsolete cords, the intersection of which with the axial ribs forms tubercles ranging in strength from minute to strong and hollow projections. Operculum with the calcified spiral lamella rising vertically from the whorl.

In 1920, 8 species were classified in the genus Abbottella in 1920.

There are several genera that appear to be related to Abbottella: Lagopoma, Rolleia, and Leiabbottella. Lagopoma contains a single species, Lagopoma lagopoma, which differs from Abbottella in the form of the outer lip. The genus Rolleia differs from Abbottella in lacking spiral sculpture; it consists of Rolleia martensi, Rolleia haitensis, and Rolleia oberi. Leiabbottella contains species lacking all sculpture except for finely incised axial grooves; this genus contains Leiabbottella galaxius, Leiabbottella soluta, and Leiabbottella thompsoni.

== Species ==
Species within the genus Abbottella include:

Subgenus Abbottella Henderson & Bartsch, 1920

The shells of species in the subgenus Abbottella are small (generally <10 mm in width), depressed, widely umbilicate and helicoid. The shell is widely expanded, often with a fimbriated peristome. Axial and spiral sculpture is usually present, usually forming cusps or serrations at the intersections. The multispiral operculum has an erect, calcified spiral lamella. The radula has a bicuspid inner marginal, in which the inner cusp is much larger than outer one.

- Abbottella abbotti Bartsch, 1946
- Abbottella adolfi (Pfeiffer, 1852)
  - Abbottella adolfi peninsularis Bartsch, 1946
- Abbottella aenea Watters, 2010
- Abbottella calliotropis Watters, 2013
- Abbottella crossei (Pilsbry, 1933)
- Abbottella diadema Watters, 2013
- Abbottella dichroa Watters, 2013
- Abbottella domingoensis Bartsch, 1946
- Abbottella gabbi (Crosse, 1873)
- Abbottella haitensis Bartsch, 1946
- Abbottella harpeza Watters & Duffy, 2010
- Abbottella mellosa Watters & Duffy, 2010
- Abbottella milleacantha Watters & Duffy, 2010
- Abbottella moreletianus (Crosse, 1873) - type species
- Abbottella newcombi (Crosse, 1873)
- Abbottella nitens Watters, 2013
- Abbottella rosaliae (Pfeiffer, 1858)
- Abbottella samanensis Bartsch, 1946
- Abbottella sanchezi Bartsch, 1946
- Abbottella sosuaensis Bartsch, 1946
- Abbottella tenebrosa Watters, 2013
- Abbottella tentorium (Pfeiffer, 1850)
- Abbottella urbana Watters, 2012
- Abbottella wilhelmi (Pfeiffer, 1858)

Subgenus Gundlachtudora Torre & Bartsch, 1941 - altogether 3 species

Species in the subgenus Gundlachtudora have a shell which is small in size for this family (type species ca. 9 mm maximum width, including peristome), depressed, helicoid in shape. The umbilicus is wide. The protoconch is not decollated, and consists of 11/4 smooth, minute whorls. Spiral sculpture is absent (or barely present in the umbilicus). Axial threads on early whorls are widely spaced, and barely perceptible. On the last whorl there is axial sculpture of microscopic, widely spaced grooves. The aperture is double, circular, adnate to the adjacent whorl, and expanded to various degrees. The operculum is multispiral with a thin, oblique lamella.

- Abbottella bompardopolensis Bartsch, 1946
- Abbottella decolorata (Pfeiffer, 1859) - type species of the subgenus Gundlachtudora
- Abbottella paradoxa Watters, 2013

Abbottella may be organized into five species complexes based on conchological characteristics; these groups may be worthy of subgeneric status. One complex has subdued sculpture, a globose shell with a high spire, and a metallic sheen to the shell. It occurs along the Cordillera Septentrional from Sósua to Higüey. The group consists of Abbottella mellosa and Abbottella nitens.

A second complex has small, compact shells covered with numerous, minute pustules or points, the shells often white or scarcely patterned, with only moderately expanded outer lips. This group occurs in the lowlands on the southeastern coast from Santo Domingo to the easternmost portion of the island and north to the Samaná Peninsula. It consists of Abbottella milleacantha, Abbottella aenea, Abbottella tentorium, Abbottella urbana, Abbottella crossei, and Abbottella calliotropis.

A third complex consists of species with rather large, openly coiled to nearly planispiral shells with pronounced prickly sculpture and widely expanded outer lips; the shells are often strongly patterned. The group contains Abbottella haitensis, and Abbottella moreletianus. Bartsch (1946) broke Abbottella moreletianus into five subspecies. Zoogeographically, this group presents a problem: the two species occur at opposite ends of the island (Thomazeau, Haiti and the Samaná Peninsula and environs). This group will be addressed in a future study.

A fourth complex consists of species with small, turbinate shells, strongly sculptured with the outer lip serrate or undulating. The group is distributed in the Cordillera Septentrional from Sósua to the eastern tip of the Samaná Peninsula. It contains Abbottella rosaliae and Abbottella abbotti. Abbottella gabbi may belong to this group as well.

The fifth complex consists of species with generally large, turbinate shells with minute sculpture often arranged in blocks; the outer lip is broadly expanded and the shells are usually darkly colored. It occurs along most of the Cordillera Septentrional, from Puerto Plata through the Samaná Peninsula. The group consists of Abbottella newcombi, Abbottella samanensis, Abbottella sanchezi, Abbottella adolfi, Abbottella dichroa, Abbottella tenebrosa, and Abbottella wilhelmi.

The several remaining species do not fit into the above species complexes. Abbottella harpeza from Isla Beata, somewhat resembles Abbottella gabbi but occurs nearly 200 km away from any other Abbottella species. The peculiar sculpture of Abbottella diadema is so unique that this species may warrant a new genus to contain it.

== Habitat ==
Most species are associated with limestone outcrops, often in humid forests. Even those species living in the lowlands away from the mountain ranges occur on isolated limestone ridges. Limestone deposits mainly exist on the coast, whereas the interior mountain ranges are primarily igneous and do not harbor these snails. The ranges of most species appear to be quite small; some probably occur along bluffs of ca. 20 km or less. Fortunately, some species have at least a portion of their range in protected areas such as Parque Nacional Del Este, Parque Nacional Isabel De Torres, and Parque Nacional El Choco. Despite their narrow ranges, individuals are often locally abundant.
