= Zemiropsis pintado =

Scientific classification
- Kingdom: Animalia
- Phylum: Mollusca
- Class: Gastropoda
- Subclass: Caenogastropoda
- Order: Neogastropoda
- Family: Babyloniidae
- Genus: Zemiropsis
- Species: Z. pintado

Binomial name
- Zemiropsis pintado (Kilburn, 1971)

Synonyms
- Babylonia pintado Kilburn, 1971; Babylonia pintado f. millepunctata (W. H. Turton, 1932); Eburna (Babylonia) millipunctata W. H. Turton, 1932

Species of gastropod

Zemiropsis pintado is a species of sea snail, a marine gastropod mollusk, in the family Babyloniidae.
