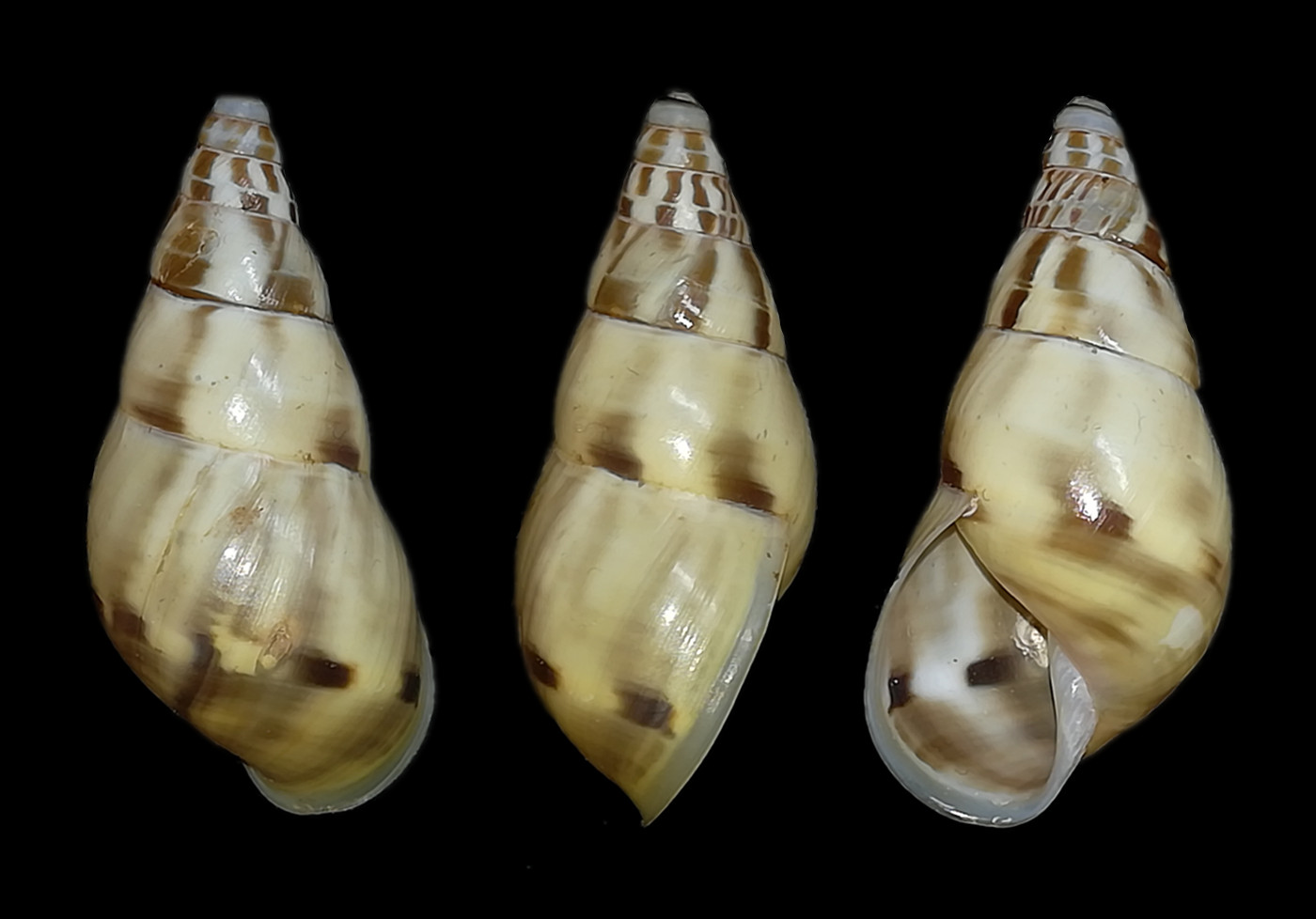

Scientific classification
- Kingdom: Animalia
- Phylum: Mollusca
- Class: Gastropoda
- Order: Stylommatophora
- Family: Camaenidae
- Genus: Amphidromus
- Species: A. iunior

Binomial name
- Amphidromus iunior Cilia, 2013

Synonyms
- Amphidromus (Syndromus) iunior Cilia, 2013· accepted, alternate representation

= Amphidromus iunior =

Species of tree snail

Amphidromus iunior is a rare species of colourful, medium-sized air-breathing tree snail, an arboreal gastropod mollusk in the family Camaenidae.

== Description ==
The length of the shell attains 27.65 mm.

== Distribution ==
This species is found in Sumba Island in East Nusa Tenggara, Indonesia.

== Etymology ==
The species is named for the youngest son of John Abbas, who encountered this hitherto unrecorded species during one of his expeditions. Another species of Amphidromus named for John, A. (S.) abbasi, is closely related to this species, but is significantly larger, amongst other differences. The meaning of iunior therefore takes on another meaning, referring to the relative size of the snail (iunior is the comparative form of iuvenis, meaning young in Latin).
