= Stramonita canaliculata =

Scientific classification
- Kingdom: Animalia
- Phylum: Mollusca
- Class: Gastropoda
- Subclass: Caenogastropoda
- Order: Neogastropoda
- Family: Muricidae
- Genus: Stramonita
- Species: S. canaliculata

Binomial name
- Stramonita canaliculata (Gray, 1839)

Synonyms
- Fusus canaliculatus Gray, 1839; Thais floridana haysae Clench, 1927

Species of gastropod

Stramonita canaliculata is a species of sea snail, a marine gastropod mollusk in the family Muricidae, the murex snails or rock snails.
