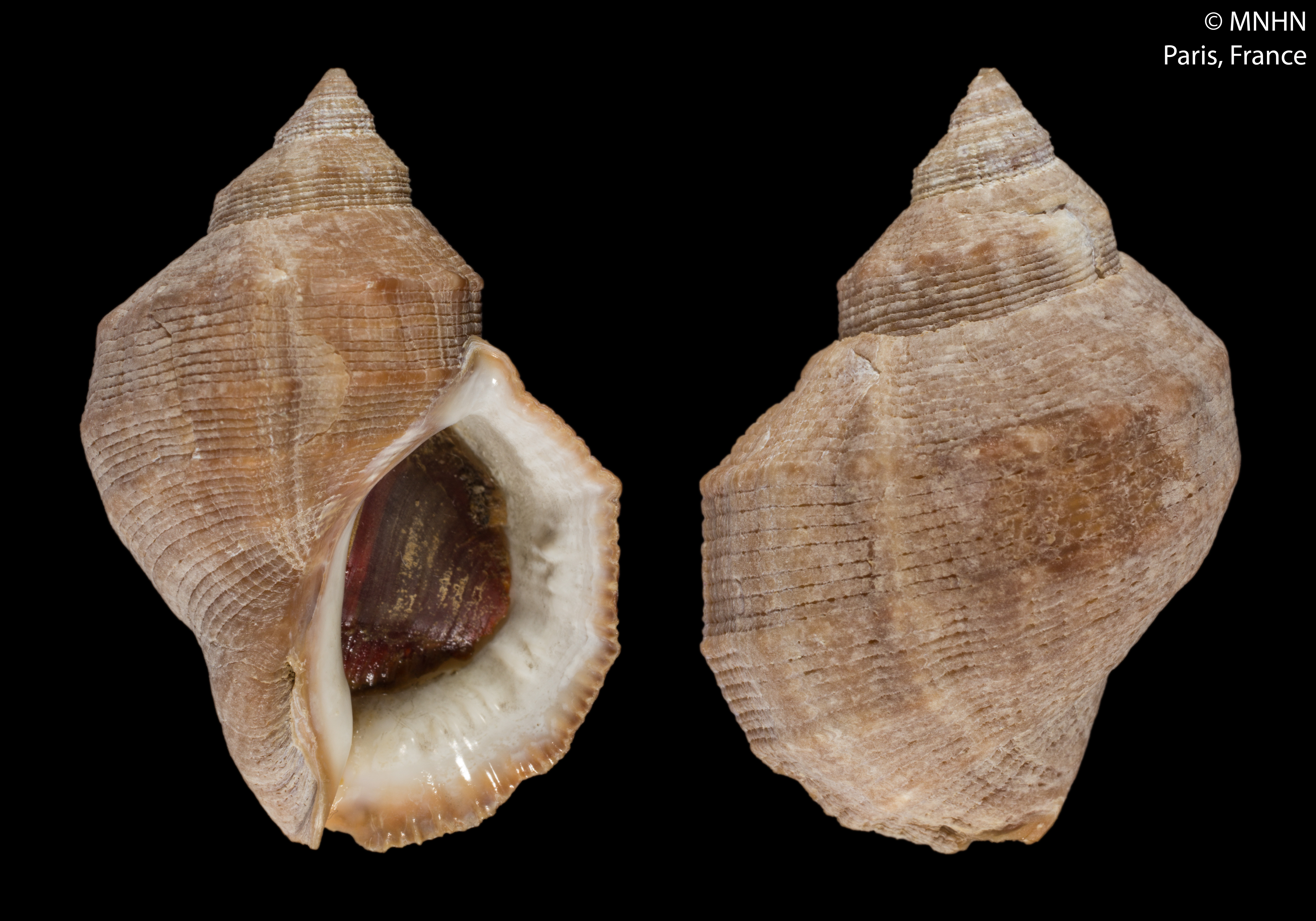
- Shell of Stramonita delessertiana (syntype at MNHN, Paris)

Scientific classification
- Kingdom: Animalia
- Phylum: Mollusca
- Class: Gastropoda
- Subclass: Caenogastropoda
- Order: Neogastropoda
- Family: Muricidae
- Genus: Stramonita
- Species: S. delessertiana

Binomial name
- Stramonita delessertiana (Orbigny, 1841)

Synonyms
- Purpura blainvillei Deshayes, 1844 (original combination); Purpura callaoensis sensu Blainville; Purpura delessertiana Orbigny, 1841; Purpura peruviana Eydoux & Souleyet, 1852; Stramonita blainvillei (Deshayes, 1844); Thais peruensis Dall, 1909

= Stramonita delessertiana =

Species of gastropod

Stramonita delessertiana is a species of sea snail, a marine gastropod mollusk in the family Muricidae, the murex snails or rock snails.

== Distribution ==
This marine species occurs off Peru.
