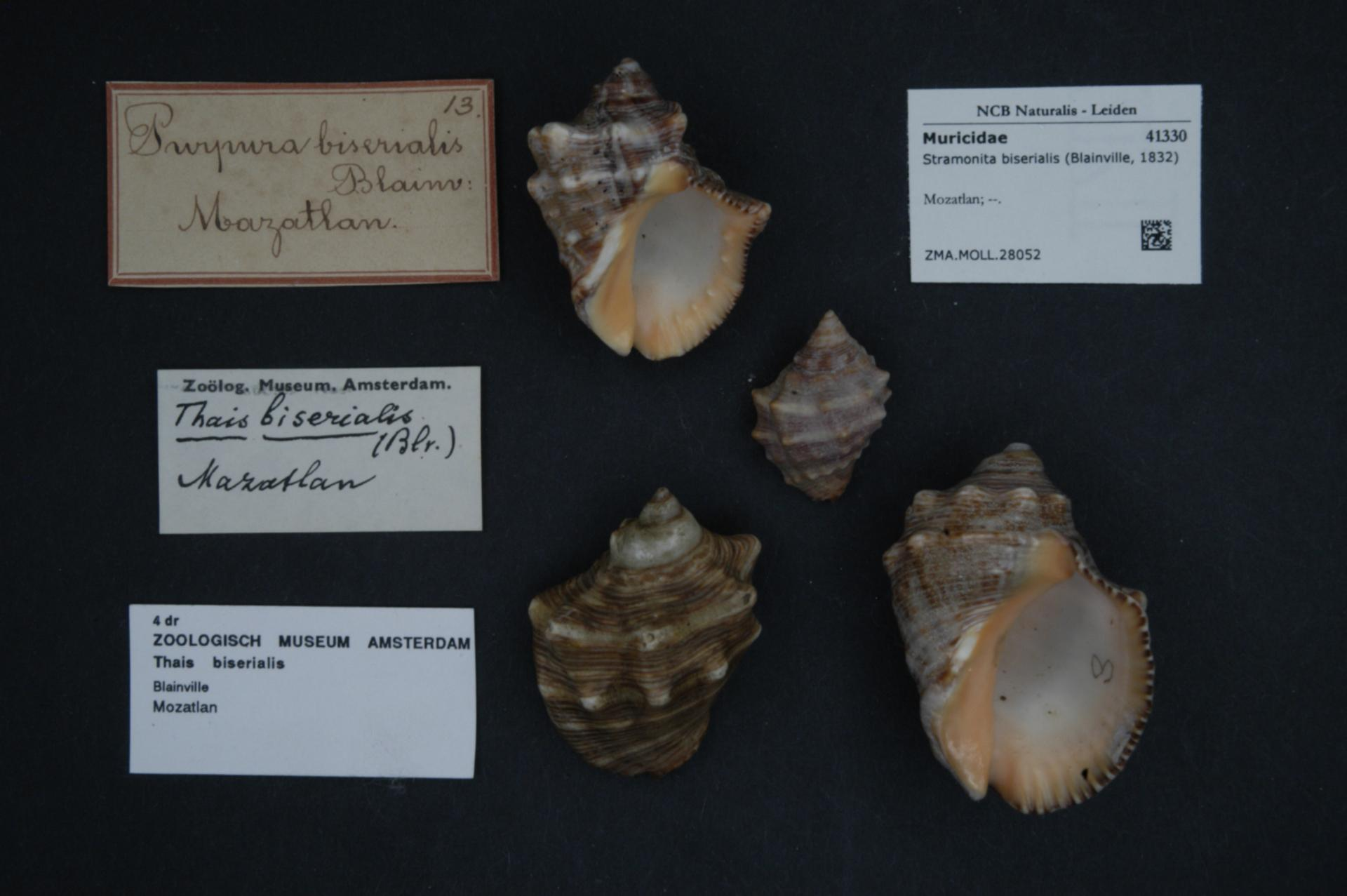
- Stramonita biserialis shells

Scientific classification
- Kingdom: Animalia
- Phylum: Mollusca
- Class: Gastropoda
- Subclass: Caenogastropoda
- Order: Neogastropoda
- Family: Muricidae
- Genus: Stramonita
- Species: S. biserialis

Binomial name
- Stramonita biserialis (Blainville, 1832)

Synonyms
- Purpura bicostalis Lamarck, 1816; Thais biserialis Blainville, 1832; Purpura biserialis Blainville, 1832; Purpura haematura Valenciennes, 1846; Purpura peruviana Eydoux & Souleyet, 1852; Thais peruensis Dall, 1909

= Stramonita biserialis =

Species of gastropod

Stramonita biserialis is a species of sea snail, a marine gastropod mollusk in the family Muricidae, the murex snails or rock snails.

== Description ==
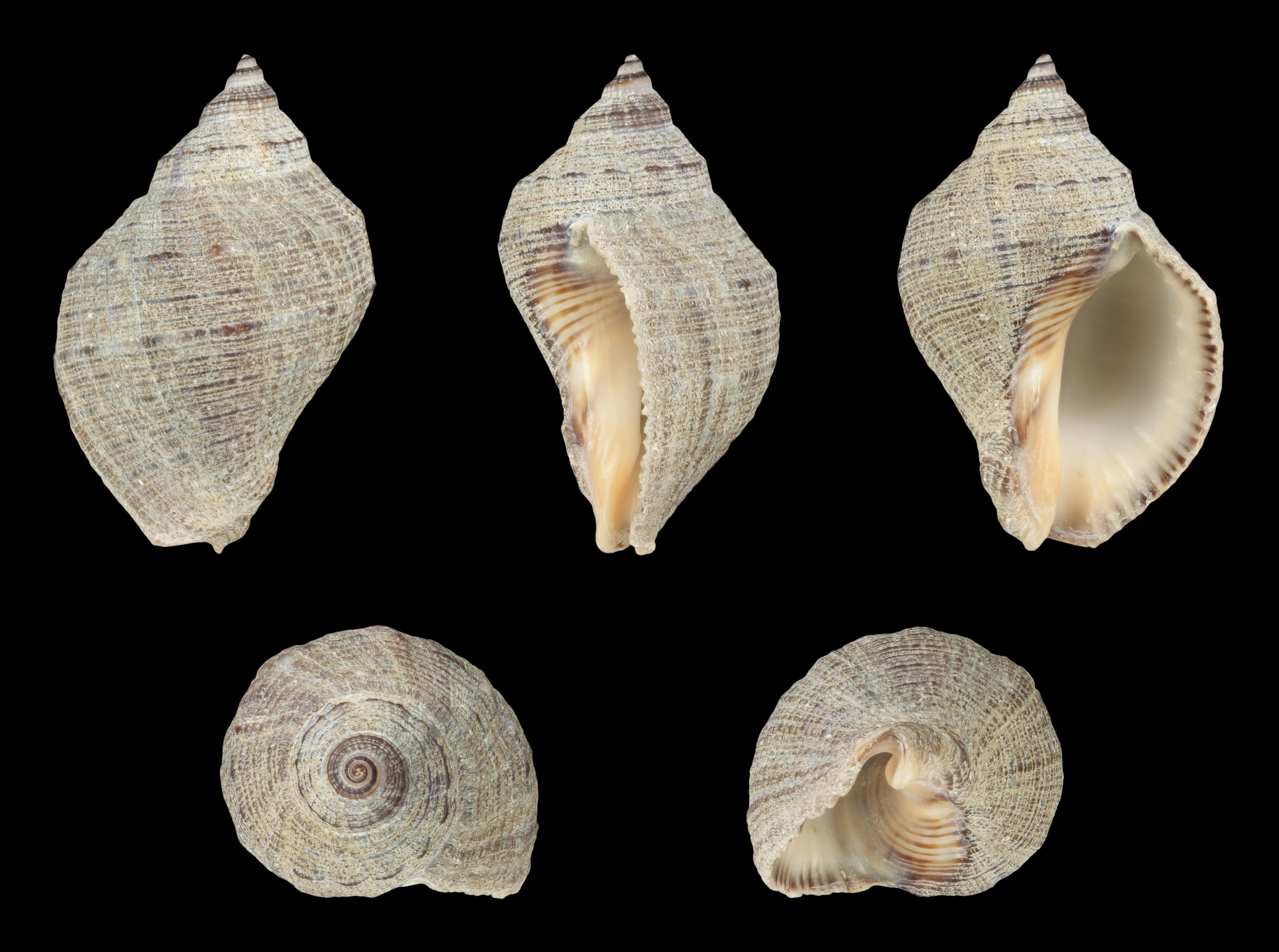
Smooth form

Stramonita biserialis is fairly small, with the shells of adults typically being 4–6 cm long, although they can be bigger or smaller depending on their age.

=== Morphological differences ===
S. biserialis inhabits both the upper and lower areas of the intertidal zone, and as such has adapted to the strong wave action of the lower intertidal and the many predators of the upper intertidal in different ways.

In the wave-exposed lower intertidal, S. biserialis have adapted more streamlined shells with thinner shell walls, a bigger shell opening, and foot area, more powerful attachment strength, and a higher metabolic rate.

Streamlined shells help them to be less affected by hydrodynamic force, while thinner shell walls allow them to spend less energy constructing shells that they don’t need to use against predators, which generally stick to the upper intertidal. A bigger operculum and foot area allow them to have much stronger attachment strength, which is probably also the reason behind their higher metabolic rate.

In the upper intertidal, S. biserialis has a thicker, smaller, and more rounded shell, with a smaller opening, in order to make it more difficult for predators to break through the shell.

== Distribution ==
They range from the Gulf of California to the northern coast of Chile.

== Feeding habits ==
S. biserialis feeds upon oysters, mussels, barnacles, and even other snails.

They will consume snails from the genus Turbo (turban snails), but one of their most frequent especially on the genus Mexacanthina, which are competitors for space and food in many of the areas that S. bisarialia inhabits.

While muricid snails typically drill straight through the shell of their prey, S. biserialis instead drills through the outer edge of the operculum.

Once a hole has been drilled, they excrete toxins into the area. This is also done in commissure attacks on bivalves. It is also possible that, in addition to killing the prey, the toxins help to deter potential thieves of prey.

S. biserialis has been known to hunt in packs in order to take down large prey, or just to quicken the hunting process. Even though the food needs to be shared, this, combined with the toxins, allow S. biserialis to hunt prey many times faster than other sea snails, some of which can take up to a week to complete a drill hole.

== Interaction with Hermit crabs ==
The shells of S. biserialis are frequently used by hermit crabs such as Calcinus californiensis, at least in part due to the commonness of the snails.

Particularly, the hermit crabs that reside within the surf choose shells from the Stramonita genus more frequently. This is most likely due to the fact that Stramonita shells are heavier, which ends up being a boon in heavily wave-washed areas, as it allows them to spend less energy fighting the pull of the waves.

Contrarily, during times of stress (i.e. when a predator is nearby) hermit crabs tend to prefer shells that are lighter, in order to better be able to flee. Because of this, crabs using S. biserialis shells tend to panic and make more mistakes when choosing shells in the presence of predators, as they have less of an ability to flee.
