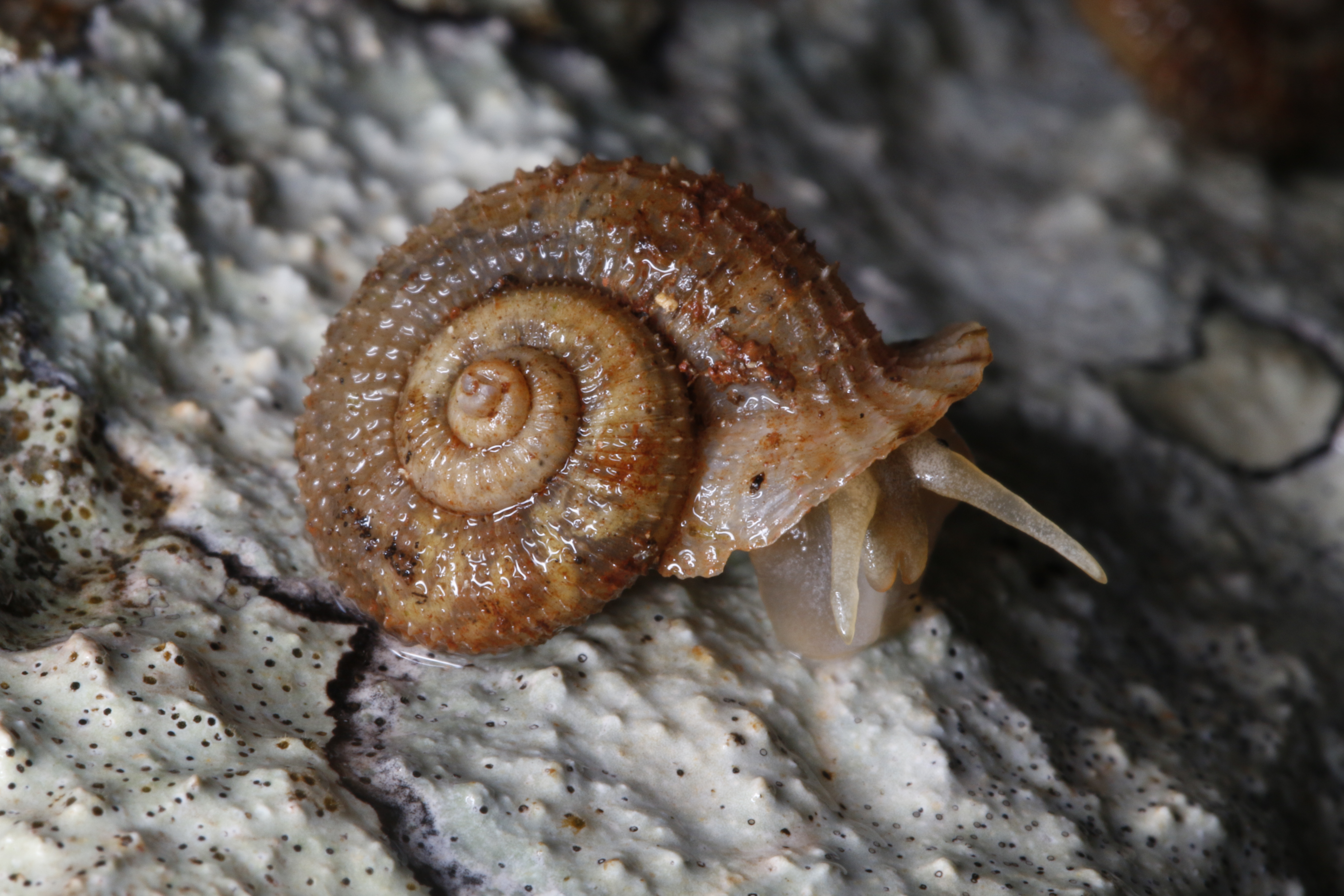

Scientific classification
- Domain: Eukaryota
- Kingdom: Animalia
- Phylum: Mollusca
- Class: Gastropoda
- Subclass: Caenogastropoda
- Order: Littorinimorpha
- Family: Pomatiidae
- Genus: Abbottella
- Species: A. domingoensis

Binomial name
- Abbottella domingoensis Bartsch, 1946
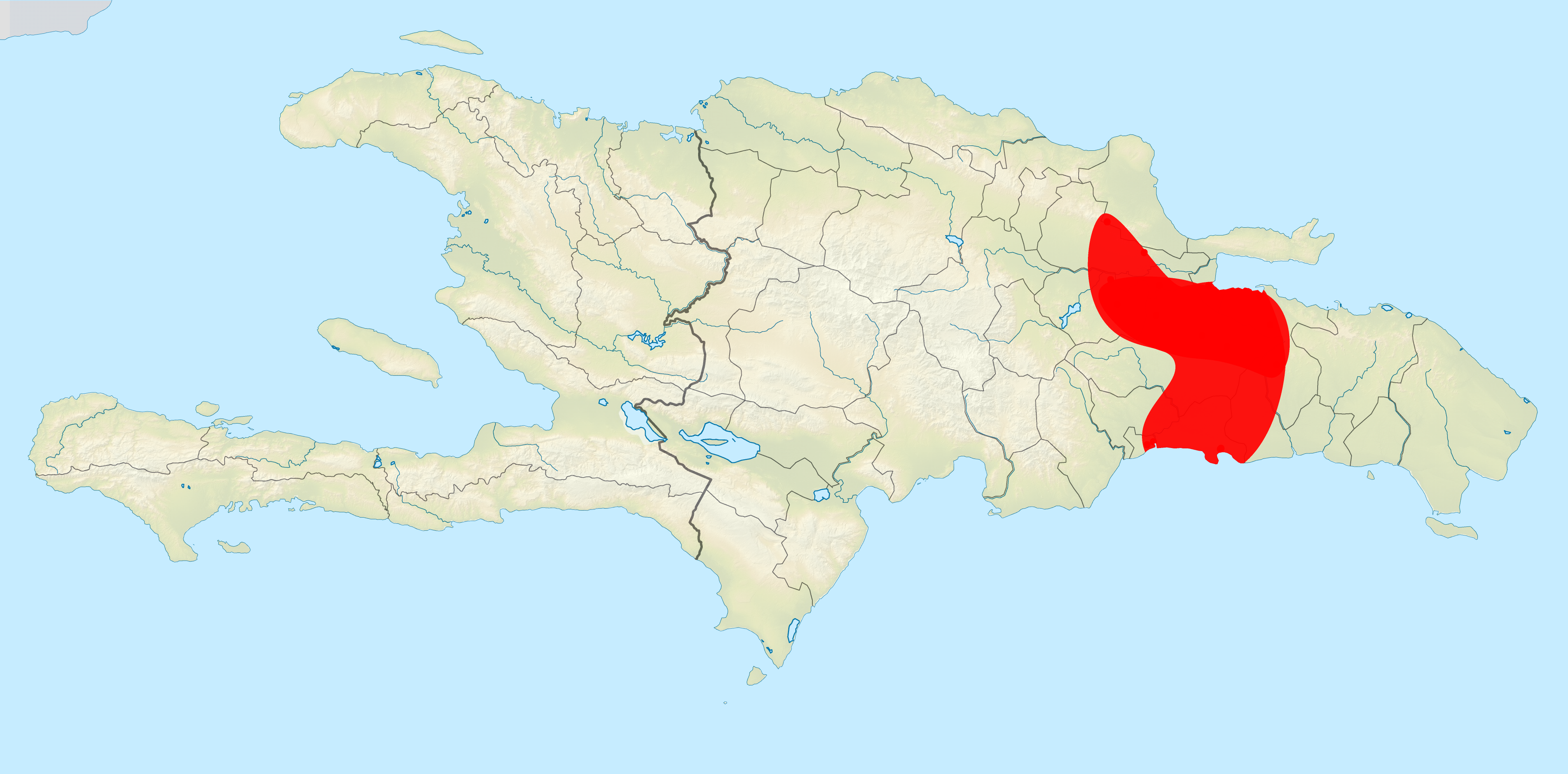
- Distribution of Abbottella domingoensis. Known range in red.

Synonyms
- Abbottella moreletiana domingoensis Bartsch, 1946; Abbottella moreletiana gabrieli Bartsch, 1946; Abbottella moreletiana wetmorei Bartsch, 1946

= Abbottella domingoensis =

Species of snail

Abbottella domingoensis is a species of operculate land snail in the family Pomatiidae. This species is endemic to the Dominican Republic.

== Distribution ==
This species is endemic to the Dominican Republic, where it can be found in lowlands below 200 meters in the Rio Yuna valley and its tributaries, from Duarte and Sánchez Ramírez provinces to Hato Mayor provinces, along the eastern end of the Cordillera Septentrional and the northern Cordillera Oriental. Also known as the Sierra de El Seibo, a series of low hills of the Los Ranchos Formation (under 200m) in Monte Plata Province that stretches from the Cordillera Central in the west to the Cordillera Oriental in the east.

== Ecology ==
Members of this species, like the rest of the Annulariidae, are calciphiles who never venture far from limestone outcrops. They are often found in mesic environments.

On karst limestone ridges, this species has been discovered under rocks and debris. Also discovered under debris and ruins in the Boca Chica area of Santo Domingo. It's fairly common in this region.
