= Zemiropsis rosadoi =

Scientific classification
- Kingdom: Animalia
- Phylum: Mollusca
- Class: Gastropoda
- Subclass: Caenogastropoda
- Order: Neogastropoda
- Family: Babyloniidae
- Genus: Zemiropsis
- Species: Z. rosadoi

Binomial name
- Zemiropsis rosadoi (Bozzetti, 1998)

Synonyms
- Babylonia rosadoi Bozzetti, 1998 (basionym)

Species of gastropod

Zemiropsis rosadoi is a species of sea snail, a marine gastropod mollusk in the family Babyloniidae.

== Distribution ==
This species occurs in the Indian Ocean off of Mozambique.
