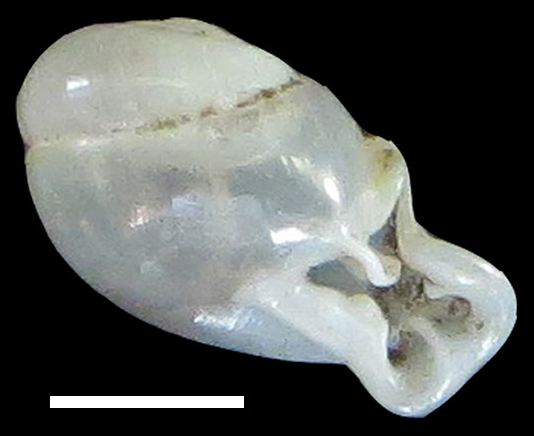
- Shell of holotype of Perrottetia hongthinhae. Scale bar is 2 mm.

Scientific classification
- Kingdom: Animalia
- Phylum: Mollusca
- Class: Gastropoda
- Order: Stylommatophora
- Family: Streptaxidae
- Genus: Perrottetia
- Species: P. hongthinhae

Binomial name
- Perrottetia hongthinhae D.-S. Do, 2017

= Perrottetia hongthinhae =

Species of gastropod

Perrottetia hongthinhae is a species of air-breathing land snail, a terrestrial pulmonate gastropod mollusc in the family Streptaxidae.

The specific name hongthinhae is in honour of Nguyen Thi Hong Thinh, the wife of the malacologist Do Duc Sang.

The holotype is deposited in Vietnam National Museum of Nature in Hanoi (Bảo tàng thiên nhiên Việt Nam). Paratypes are deposited in Museum of Biology of Hanoi National University of Education, Vietnam.

== Distribution ==
Location of the type locality.

Distribution of Perrottetia hongthinhae include the type locality only. It is in Vietnam.

The type locality is limestone forests in Nam Loong Commune, Lai Châu City, Lai Châu Province in Vietnam, 22°25′16″N 103°22′25″E, 1,226 m a.s.l.

== Description ==
The shape of the shell is oblique-heliciform. The color of the shell is white and translucent. The shell has six whorls. The spire is weakly convex. Apical angle varies from 21.3 to 24.8. Suture is distinct. Shell is glossy with transverse ridges on upper surface. Embryonic shell is large, with about 2½ whorls. Subsequent whorls are regularly coiled. Body whorl is axially deflected. The aperture is rectangular with rounded angles. Peristome is discontinuous. The parietal callus is relatively thick. Lip is thickened, broadly expanded and reflected. There is shallow sinulus present. Apertural dentition is with very large, strong parietal lamella, one palatal lamella, one large basal lamella, one strong columellar lamella and one small supracolumellar lamella. Umbilicus is widely open and shallow.

The width of the shell is 5.6–5.8 mm. The height of the shell is 3.2–3.3 mm.

No live specimens have been found as of its type description in 2017.

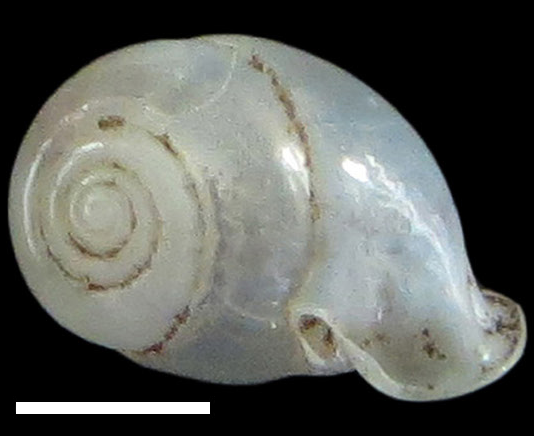
Oblique apical view.

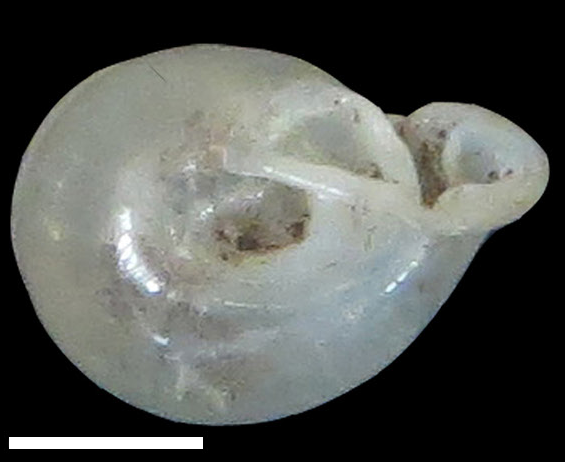
Umbilical view.

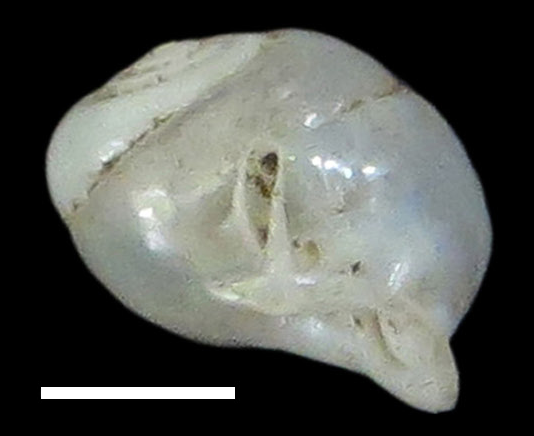
Lateral view.

=== Similar species ===
Perrottetia hongthinhae differs from Perrottetia dugasti in having a single parietal lamella, a strong higher basal lamella, and a rectangular aperture with rounded angles.

Compared to Perrottetia messageri, the Perrottetia hongthinhae has a smaller shell with weak transverse ridges, and the body whorl moderately expanded.

Compared to its congeners from Vietnam (Perrottetia aberrata, Perrottetia daedalus, Perrottetia gudei, Perrottetia mabillei, and Perrottetia simonianus), Perrottetia hongthinhae has a relatively smaller shell, and the profiles of the shell base are quite different in all five species.

The Perrottetia hongthinhae differs from Perrottetia unidentata in its smooth shell surface, smaller size, and in having a rectangular aperture with rounded angles.

== Ecology ==
This species inhabits limestone forests at 1,226 m a.s.l.

Species in the genus Perrottetia are carnivorous.
