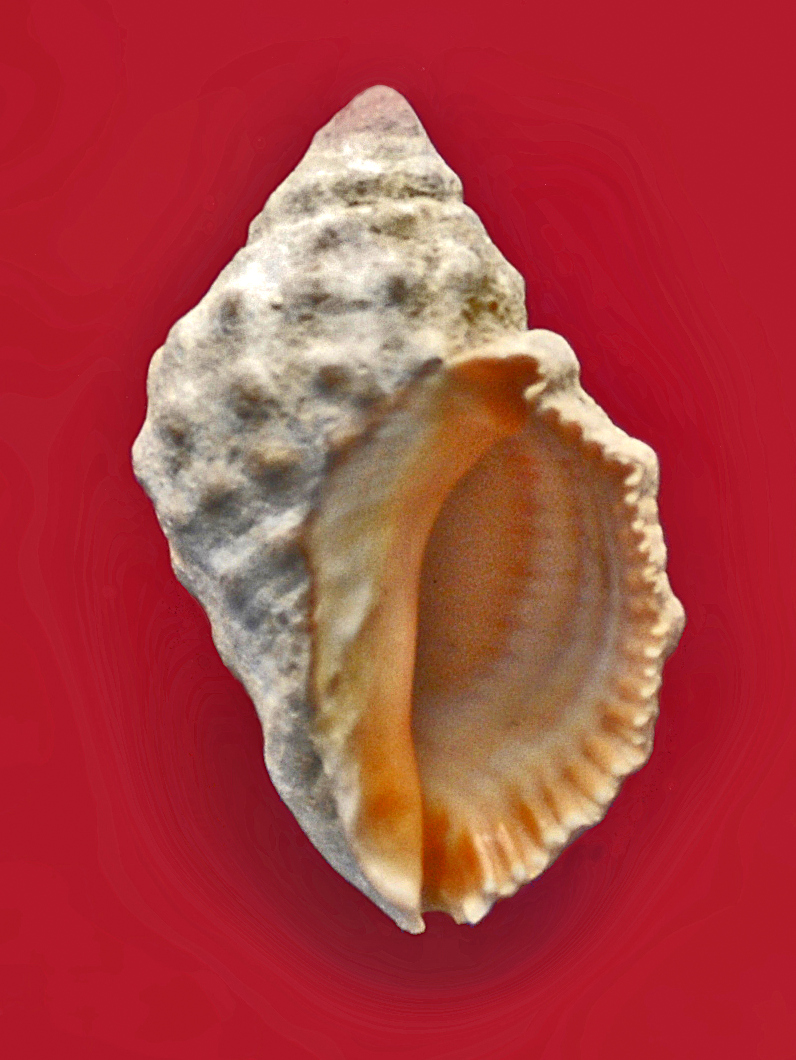
- Stramonita haemastoma

Scientific classification
- Kingdom: Animalia
- Phylum: Mollusca
- Class: Gastropoda
- Subclass: Caenogastropoda
- Order: Neogastropoda
- Superfamily: Muricoidea
- Family: Muricidae
- Subfamily: Rapaninae
- Genus: Stramonita; Schumacher, 1817

Type species
- Buccinum haemastoma Linnaeus, 1767

Synonyms
- Purpura (Stramonita) Schumacher, 1817; Thais (Stramonita) Schumacher, 1817

= Stramonita =

Genus of gastropods

Stramonita is a genus of predatory sea snails, marine gastropod molluscs in the subfamily Rapaninae of the family Muricidae, the rock snails.

== Description ==
The spire is elevated. The whorls are simple or nodulous. The aperture is moderate and produced anteriorly. The columella is rounded and simple in front.

== Species ==
The genus Stramonita contains the following species:

- Stramonita alderi Petuch & Berschauer, 2020
- Stramonita biserialis (Blainville, 1832)
- Stramonita brasiliensis Claremont & D.G. Reid, 2011
- Stramonita buchecki Petuch, 2013
- Stramonita canaliculata (Gray, 1839)
- Stramonita dayunensis (Z.-Y. Chen & Z.-J. You, 2009)
- Stramonita delessertiana (Orbigny, 1841)
- Stramonita floridana (Conrad, 1837)
- Stramonita haemastoma (Linnaeus, 1767)
- Stramonita rustica (Lamarck, 1822)

Species brought into synonymy

- Stramonita armigera (Link, 1807) accepted as Mancinella armigera Link, 1807
- Stramonita bicarinata (Blainville, 1832) accepted as Stramonita rustica (Lamarck, 1822)
- Stramonita bicarinata (Blainville, 1832): synonym of Stramonita rustica (Lamarck, 1822)
- Stramonita blainvillei (Deshayes, 1844): synonym of Stramonita delessertiana (Orbigny, 1841)
- Stramonita chocolata (Duclos, 1832): synonym of Thaisella chocolata (Duclos, 1832)
- Stramonita hederacea Schumacher, 1817: synonym of Nassa serta (Bruguière, 1789)
- Stramonita muricina (Blainville, 1832) accepted as Semiricinula muricina (Blainville, 1832)
