= Stramonita floridana =

Scientific classification
- Kingdom: Animalia
- Phylum: Mollusca
- Class: Gastropoda
- Subclass: Caenogastropoda
- Order: Neogastropoda
- Family: Muricidae
- Genus: Stramonita
- Species: S. floridana

Binomial name
- Stramonita floridana (Conrad, 1837)

Synonyms
- Purpura floridana Conrad, 1837

Species of gastropod

Stramonita floridana is a species of sea snail, a marine gastropod mollusk in the family Muricidae, the murex snails or rock snails.

== Description ==
Shell size 50-80 mm.

== Distribution ==
Western Atlantic Ocean: Florida, USA.
