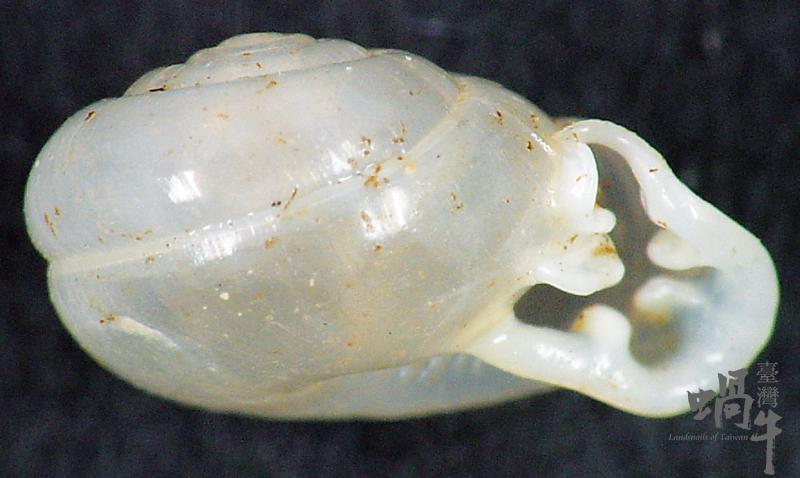
- Perrottetia heudei shell

Scientific classification
- Kingdom: Animalia
- Phylum: Mollusca
- Class: Gastropoda
- Order: Stylommatophora
- Family: Streptaxidae
- Genus: Perrottetia
- Species: P. heudei

Binomial name
- Perrottetia heudei (Schmacker & Böttger, 1891)

Synonyms
- Odontartemon heudei (Schmacker et Boettger, 1891); Odontartemon (Perrottetia) heudei Schmacker et Boettger; Oophana heudei (Schmacker et Boettger, 1891); Streptaxis heudei (original combination)

= Perrottetia heudei =

Species of gastropod

Perrottetia heudei is a species of air-breathing land snail, a terrestrial pulmonate gastropod mollusc in the family Streptaxidae.

== Distribution ==
This species is mainly distributed in Taiwan. Endemic to Northern Taibu Mountain in Pingtung County of Taiwan, the snail is also seen in other areas of Southern Taiwan, as well as Nishiyama in Japan.
