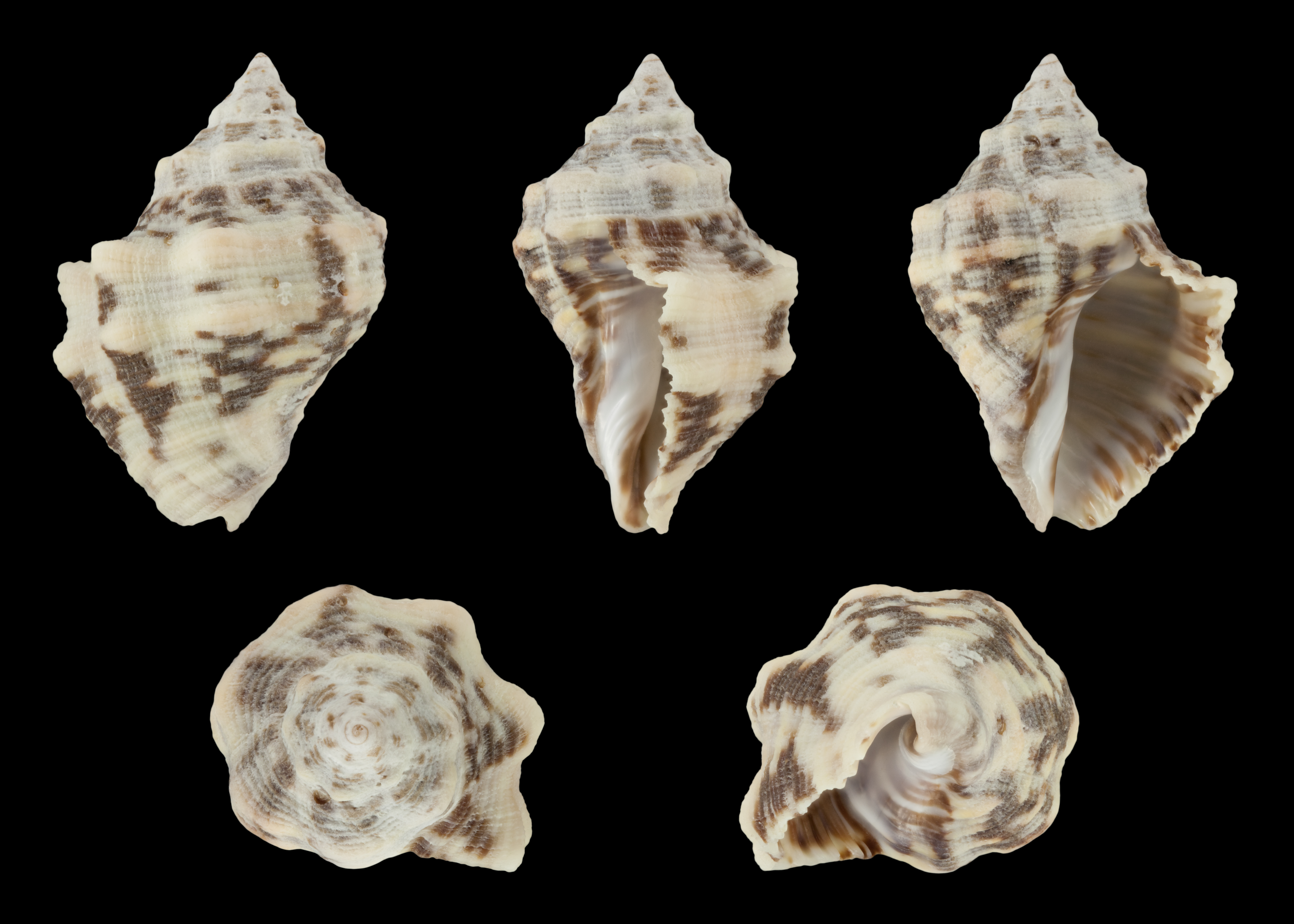

Scientific classification
- Kingdom: Animalia
- Phylum: Mollusca
- Class: Gastropoda
- Subclass: Caenogastropoda
- Order: Neogastropoda
- Family: Muricidae
- Genus: Stramonita
- Species: S. rustica

Binomial name
- Stramonita rustica (Lamarck, 1822)

Synonyms
- Purpura albocincta Küster, 1860; Purpura bicarinata Blainville, 1832; Purpura fasciata Reeve, 1846; Purpura helena Quoy & Gaimard, 1833 ·; Purpura minor Hidalgo, 1893; Purpura rustica Lamarck, 1822; Stramonita bicarinata (Blainville, 1832); Thais rustica (Lamarck, 1822)

= Stramonita rustica =

Species of gastropod

Stramonita rustica is a species of sea snail, a marine gastropod mollusk in the family Muricidae, the murex snails or rock snails.
