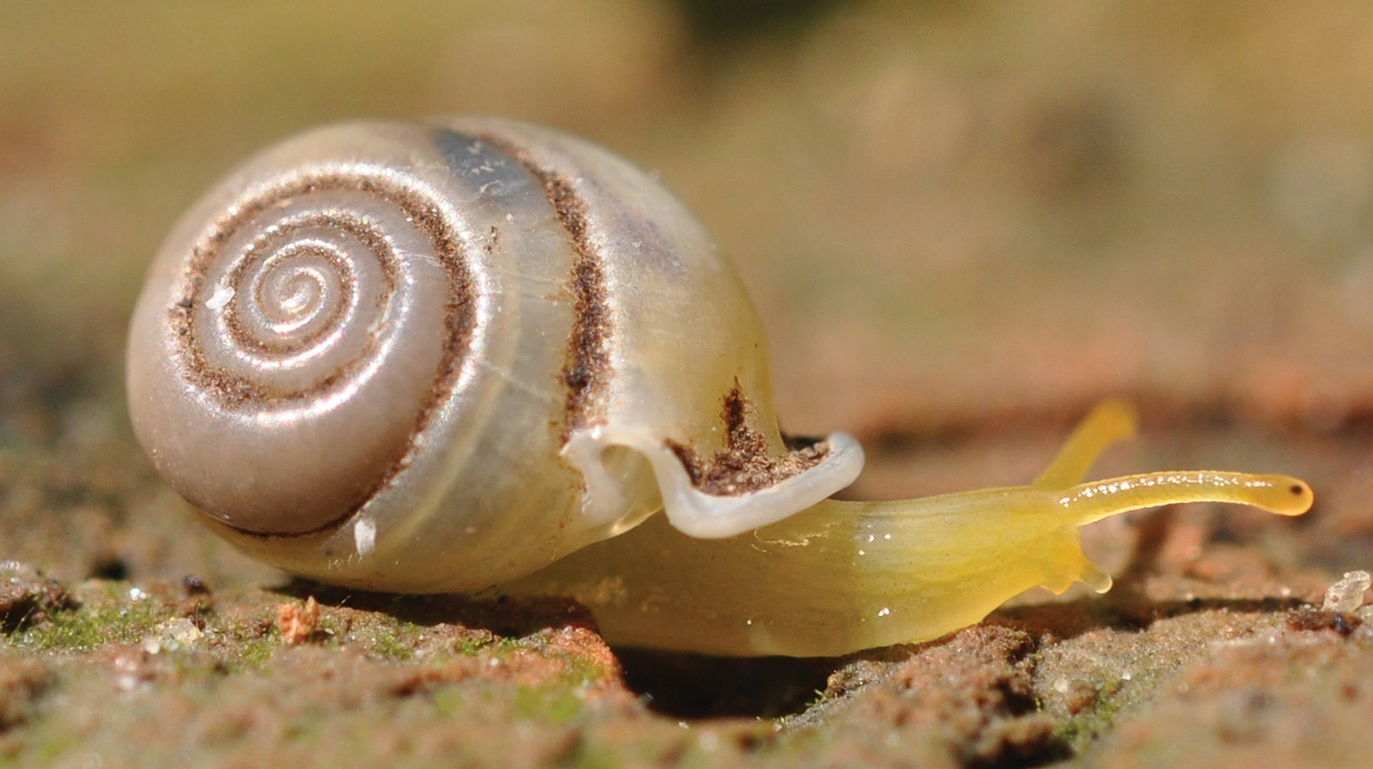
- Perrottetia aquilonaris

Scientific classification
- Kingdom: Animalia
- Phylum: Mollusca
- Class: Gastropoda
- Order: Stylommatophora
- Suborder: Achatinina
- Superfamily: Streptaxoidea
- Family: Streptaxidae
- Genus: Perrottetia; Kobelt, 1905

Type species
- Helix peroteti Petit de la Saussaye, 1841

Synonyms
- Odontartemon (Perrottetia) Kobelt, 1905

= Perrottetia (gastropod) =

Genus of gastropods

Perrottetia is a genus of air-breathing land snails, terrestrial pulmonate gastropod mollusks in the family Streptaxidae.

== Distribution ==
Most species of Perrottetia live in India, but there are additional species of this genus known from Sri Lanka, Myanmar, Thailand, Laos, North to South Vietnam and Hainan Island and Taiwan in Southern China. The distribution of the genus Perrottetia includes also Mascarenes.

There is a concentration of 11 species in the Western Ghats and Eastern Ghats of peninsular India and two species are recorded from Sri Lanka, one of which is endemic.

== Description ==
The most prominent characters of Perrottetia are the sub-oblique heliciform shell, often with whorls coiling around an oblique axis. The last whorls do not descend below the preceding whorl, and short longitudinal furrows are present behind the apertural lip. Internally, the aperture possesses two parietal lamellae. Up to 2013, Perrottetia gudei was the only Perrottetia for which were published information about its internal anatomy.

The shell is oblique-heliciform, usually thin and opaque. Its surface is smooth and glossy but fine transverse ridges may be present. The embryonic shell is smooth. The 5–7 whorls increase regularly. The shell periphery is usually rounded and the last whorl does not descend below the preceding whorl but is parallel to the preceding suture. The outer wall of the last whorl generally possesses two short longitudinal furrows that correspond with internal apertural lamellae. The umbilicus is narrow and deep. The semi-ovate aperture has an expanded peristome with a reflexed lip. The apertural dentition consists of two parietal lamellae; palatal, basal and columellar lamellae are usually present; upper palatal and supracolumellar lamellae may also be present.

Living animals possess a yellowish to reddish reticulated skin. The brown digestive gland and the black kidney are visible through the transparent shell. The upper tentacles are longer than the lower pair with a black eye-spot on the tip of the fully extended tentacle. Bright red or yellow retractor muscles show though the transparent skin. The foot is narrow, undivided. The tail short.

Reproductive system: Genitalia has a long, slender penis. Penial sheath is short, about half of penis length. Internal wall of introverted penis with black to brown penial hooks. Vas deferens passes through a short section of penial sheath before connecting distally to penis. Vagina and free oviduct is short to long, vaginal hooks may be present. Gametolytic duct and sac may not extend as far as albumin gland. Seminal vesicle is present with about the same length from vesicle to talon.

== Species ==
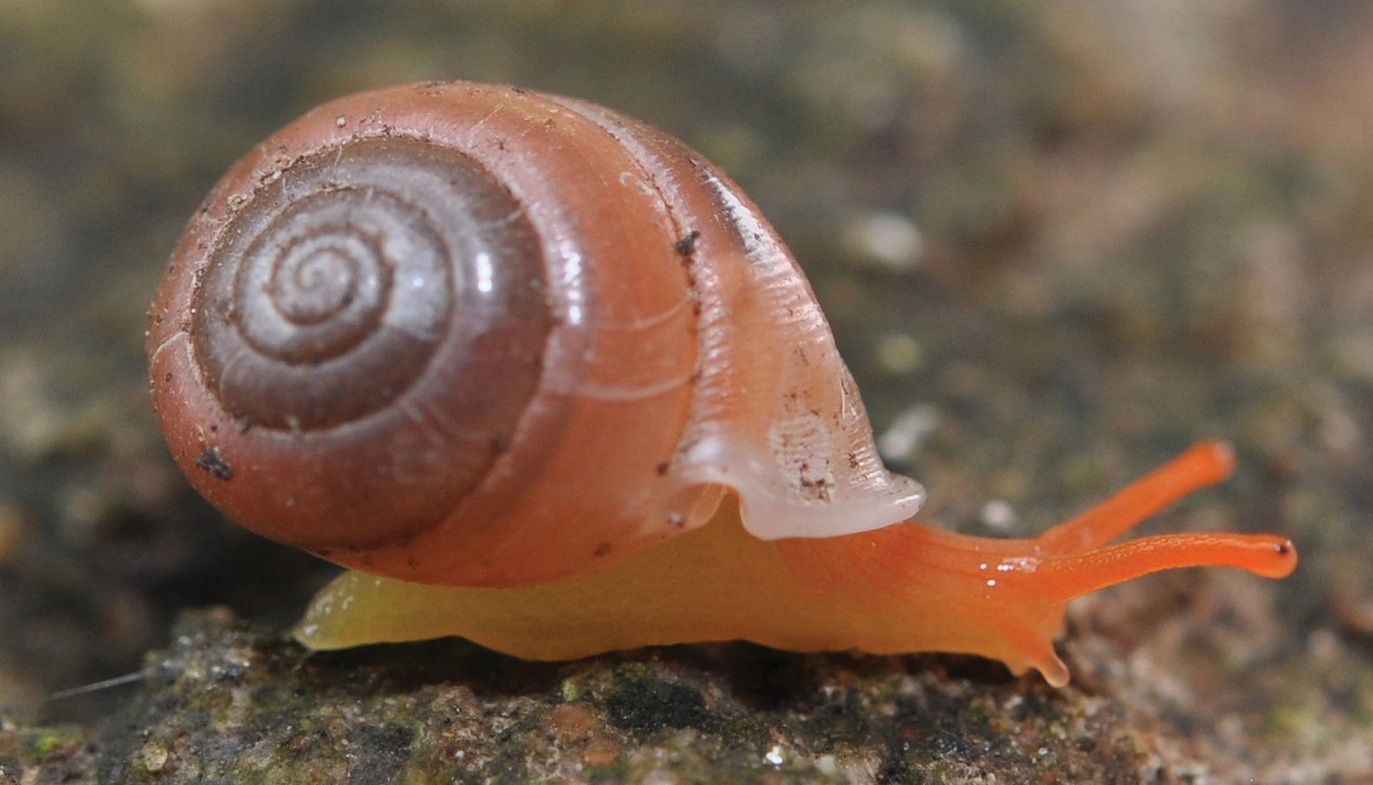
Perrottetia dermapyrrhosa

Up to 2013, all nominal species of Perrottetia were described over a century ago and were often based on brief descriptions with poorly detailed figures. Perrottetia was a poorly known genus with 27 nominal species prior to 2013. Zoologists described several new species of Perrottetia in 2013-2017.

Species within the genus Perrottetia include:

- Perrottetia aberrata (Souleyet, 1852)
- Perrottetia aquilonaris Siriboon & Panha, 2013
- Perrottetia beddomei (Blanford, 1899)
- Perrottetia canarica (W. T. Blanford, 1869)
- Perrottetia compressa (W. T. Blanford, 1881)
- Perrottetia concinnus (W. T. Blanford, 1881)
- Perrottetia cristatella (Möllendorff, 1901)
- Perrottetia daedalea (Bavay & Dautzenberg, 1908)
- Perrottetia dermapyrrhosa Siriboon & Panha, 2013
- Perrottetia dugasti (Morlet, 1892)
- Perrottetia footei (W. T. Blanford & H. F. Blanford, 1861)
- Perrottetia fruhstorferi (Möllendorff)
- Perrottetia gregoi Thach, 2018
- Perrottetia gudei (Fulton, 1915)
- Perrottetia heudei (Schmacker & Böttger, 1891)
- Perrottetia hongthinhae D.-S. Do, 2017
- Perrottetia mabillei (Bavay et Dautzenberg, 1903)
- Perrottetia megadentata Inkhavilay & Panha, 2016
- Perrottetia messageri (Bavay et Dautzenberg, 1908)
- Perrottetia namdongensis Bui & Do V. N., 2019
- Perrottetia oppidulum (Bavay et Dautzenberg, 1908)
- Perrottetia perrotteti (Petit de la Saussaye, 1841) - type species of the genus Perrottetia
- Perrottetia personatus (W. T. Blanford, 1881)
- Perrottetia phuphamanensis Siriboon & Panha, 2013
- Perrottetia pronus (W. T. Blanford, 1881)
- Perrottetia ravanae (W. T. Blanford, 1899)
- Perrottetia scalptus (W. T. Blanford, 1899)
- Perrottetia simoniana (Heude, 1890)
- Perrottetia subacutus (W. T. Blanford, 1899)
- Perrottetia thachi F. Huber, 2018
- Perrottetia theobaldi (Benson, 1859)
- Perrottetia unidentata Inkhavilay & Panha, 2016
- Perrottetia watsoni (Blanford, 1860)

Synonyms

- Perrottetia aquilonaria Siriboon & Panha, 2013: synonym of Perrottetia aquilonaris Siriboon & Panha, 2013 (incorrect original spelling)
- Perrottetia daedaleus (Bavay & Dautzenberg, 1909): synonym of Perrottetia daedalea (Bavay & Dautzenberg, 1909) (wrong gender agreement of specific epithet)
- Perrottetia siamensis (L. Pfeiffer, 1862): synonym of Oophana siamensis (L. Pfeiffer, 1862) (unaccepted combination)

== Ecology ==
Some South Asian species of Perrottetia were discovered at high altitudes up to 4000 m above mean sea level.

Species in the genus Perrottetia are carnivorous.
