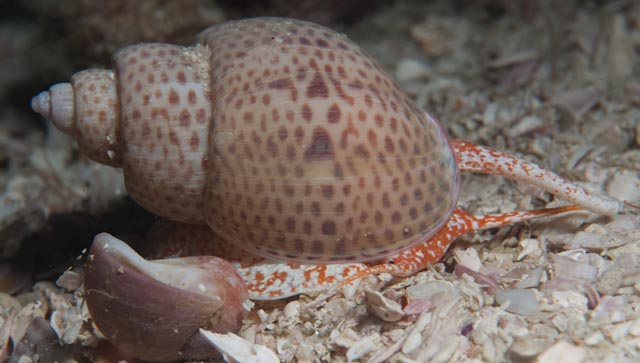
- a live Zemiropsis papillaris

Scientific classification
- Kingdom: Animalia
- Phylum: Mollusca
- Class: Gastropoda
- Subclass: Caenogastropoda
- Order: Neogastropoda
- Family: Babyloniidae
- Genus: Zemiropsis; Thiele, 1929

Type species
- Zemiropsis papillaris Sowerby, G.B. I, 1825

= Zemiropsis =

Genus of gastropods

Zemiropsis is a genus of sea snails, marine gastropod mollusks in the family Babyloniidae.

== Species ==
Species within the genus Zemiropsis include:

- Zemiropsis demertziae Fraussen & Rosado, 2013
- Zemiropsis papillaris (G.B. Sowerby I, 1825)
- Zemiropsis pintado (Kilburn, 1971)
- Zemiropsis pulchrelineata (Kilburn, 1973)
- Zemiropsis rosadoi (Bozzetti, 1998)

Species brought into synonymy

- Zemiropsis joostei Dekker, 2008: synonym of Zemiropsis papillaris (G.B. Sowerby I, 1825)
