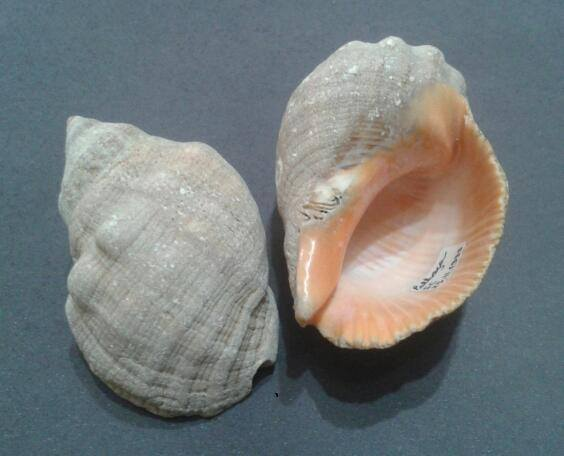
- Shells of Stramonita brasiliensis

Scientific classification
- Kingdom: Animalia
- Phylum: Mollusca
- Class: Gastropoda
- Subclass: Caenogastropoda
- Order: Neogastropoda
- Superfamily: Muricoidea
- Family: Muricidae
- Subfamily: Rapaninae
- Genus: Stramonita
- Species: S. brasiliensis

Binomial name
- Stramonita brasiliensis Claremont & Reid, 2011

= Stramonita brasiliensis =

Species of gastropod

Stramonita brasiliensis is a species of sea snail, a marine gastropod mollusk, in the family Muricidae, the murex snails or rock snails.

== Description ==
This species attains a size of 65 mm.

== Distribution ==
This species occurs in French Guiana, and further South to Bahia, Brazil.
