= Zemiropsis pulchrelineata =

Scientific classification
- Kingdom: Animalia
- Phylum: Mollusca
- Class: Gastropoda
- Subclass: Caenogastropoda
- Order: Neogastropoda
- Family: Babyloniidae
- Genus: Zemiropsis
- Species: Z. pulchrelineata

Binomial name
- Zemiropsis pulchrelineata (Kilburn, 1973)

Synonyms
- Babylonia pulchrelineata Kilburn, 1973

Species of gastropod

Zemiropsis pulchrelineata is a species of sea snail, a marine gastropod mollusk, in the family Babyloniidae.
