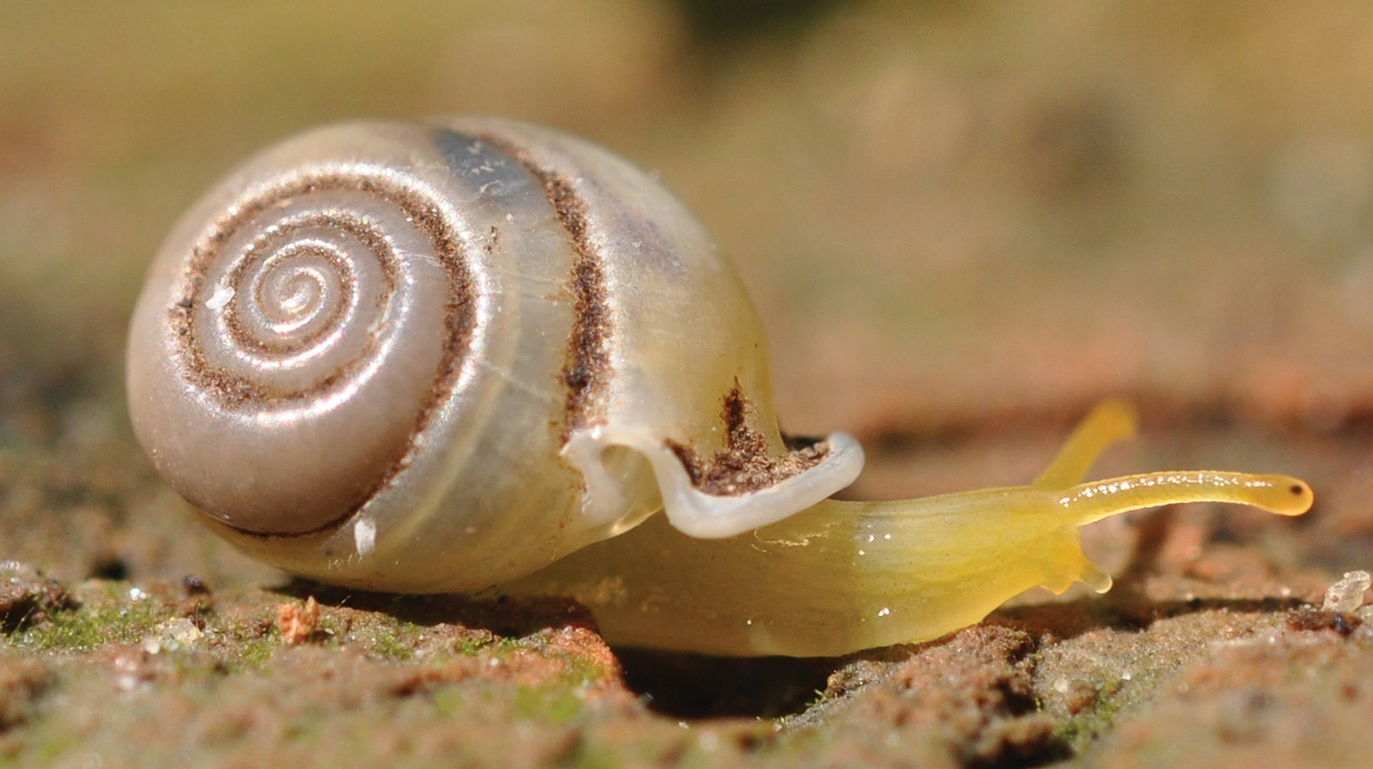
- Paratype of Perrottetia aquilonaris from the type locality with the shell width about 6 mm.

Scientific classification
- Kingdom: Animalia
- Phylum: Mollusca
- Class: Gastropoda
- Order: Stylommatophora
- Family: Streptaxidae
- Genus: Perrottetia
- Species: P. aquilonaris

Binomial name
- Perrottetia aquilonaris Siriboon & Panha, 2013

Synonyms
- Perrottetia aquilonaria Siriboon & Panha, 2013

= Perrottetia aquilonaris =

Species of gastropod

Perrottetia aquilonaris is a species of air-breathing land snail, a terrestrial pulmonate gastropod mollusc in the family Streptaxidae.

The specific name aquilonaris is from the Latin “aquilonaris” meaning “north or northern”. It refers to the distribution range of this new species in northern Thailand.

== Distribution ==
Location of the type locality.

Distribution of Perrottetia aquilonaria include several localities in Chiang Mai Province, Chiang Rai Province, Nan Province and Phrae Province in the northern part of Thailand and Sainyabuli Province in the northwest Laos and Phongsaly Province in north Laos.

The type locality is Wat Tam Pha Plong, Pha Daeng National Park, Chiang Dao District, Chiang Mai Province, Thailand, 19°24′7.3″N 98°55′5.6″E.

== Description ==
This species was described from Thailand in 2013 with a complete information on shell, radula and genitalia.

Live specimens exhibit yellowish reticulated skin, and pale yellowish tentacular retractor muscles are visible through the semi-transparent body.

The shape of the shell is suboblique-heliciform. The color of the shell is white and translucent. The shell has 5½–6 whorls. The spire is convex and suture is indistinct. The shell surface is glossy, with transverse ridges diminishing below the periphery. Embryonic shell is large, with about 2½ whorls, with smooth surface. The following whorls are regularly expanding. The periphery of the shell is shouldered. In apertural view left periphery of the penultimate whorl is extending beyond the diameter of the last whorl. The last whorl is axially deflected. There are two deep and short longitudinal furrows present. The umbilicus is narrow.

The aperture is subcircular. The peristome is discontinuous, thickened and expanded. There is short sinulus present, sometimes with a longer and tapering sinulus. Apertural dentition consists of one strong first parietal lamella, a small second parietal lamella separated at right angles, one small upper palatal lamella, one large palatal lamella, one basal lamella and a bifid columellar lamella.

The width of the shell is 5.4–7.5 mm. The height of the shell is 2.9–4.7 mm. Specimens from Laos differ only in the slightly smaller shell.

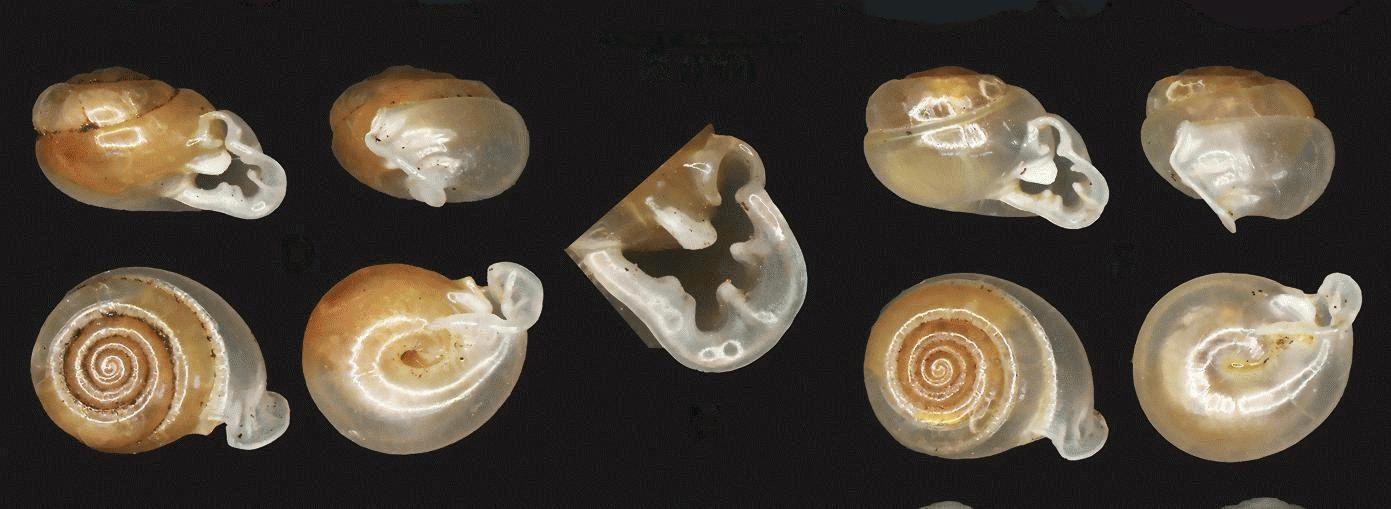
Perrottetia aquilonaris shell. The left shell is holotype with the shell width 6.6 mm and the shell height 3.9 mm and the aperture of the holotype. The right shell is paratype.

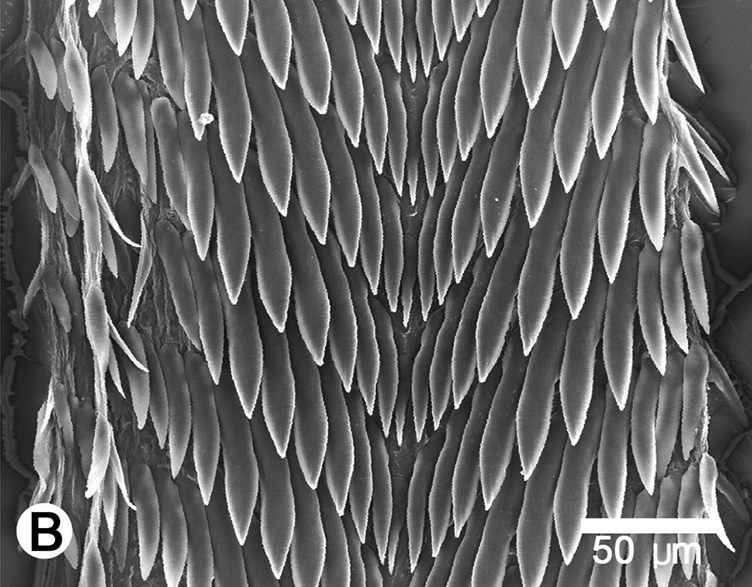
Radula of Perrottetia aquilonaris.

Digestive system: Teeth of the radula are arranged in anteriorly V-shaped rows, each row containing 21–23 teeth with the formula (10-11)-1-(10-11). The central tooth is small, sharp, triangular with pointed cusp. The lateral and marginal teeth are undifferentiated, unicuspid and lanceolate. Lateral teeth are gradually reduced in length and size, outer teeth much smaller and shorter than inner teeth.

Reproductive system of Perrottetia aquilonaris was described by Siriboon et al. in detail in 2013.

=== Similar species ===
Perrottetia aquilonaris can be distinguished from the similar south Indian species Perrottetia watsoni and Perrottetia beddomii by its smooth shell surface and the presence of a sinulus and a bifid columellar lamella. In comparison, Perrottetia beddomii possesses a supracolumellar lamella, while Perrottetia watsoni has a second parietal lamella adjacent to the first parietal lamella.

Perrottetia aquilonaris can be distinguished from Perrottetia dugasti and Perrottetia messageri from Vietnam by having a depressed spire, shouldered last whorl, thin parietal callus and upper-parietal lamella separated at a right angle. In contrast, Perrottetia dugasti has a rounded last whorl and a small upper-parietal lamella located deeper inside the aperture, and Perrottetia messageri has paralleled parietal lamellae, a small supercolumellar lamella is present, and the left side of the penultimate whorl extended beyond the diameter of the last whorl.

Perrottetia gudei from North Vietnam differs from the Perrottetia aquilonaria in its larger, oblique-heliciform shell, which is less deviated from the vertical axis. A fine transverse ridge is present at the suture. A sinulus is absent, the peristome is much thicker, and bifid columellar lamella is absent. The genital system of Perrottetia gudei differs from that of this new species by possession of a long and slender penis, an entirely free long oviduct, a gametolytic duct and sac extending as far as the albumin gland, the absence of seminal vesicles and a more scattered arrangement of penial hooks.

== Ecology ==
This species inhabits limestone areas. The animals can be found in altitudes up to 200 meters above mean sea level in Thailand.

Species in the genus Perrottetia are carnivorous.
