= Euglandina irakita =

Scientific classification
- Kingdom: Animalia
- Phylum: Mollusca
- Class: Gastropoda
- Order: Stylommatophora
- Family: Spiraxidae
- Genus: Euglandina
- Species: E. irakita

Binomial name
- Euglandina irakita Jardim, Abbate & Simone, 2013

Species of snail

Euglandina irakita is a species of medium-sized predatory air-breathing land snail, a carnivorous terrestrial pulmonate gastropod mollusk in the family Spiraxidae.

== Distribution ==
This species occurs in the Amazon rainforest.
