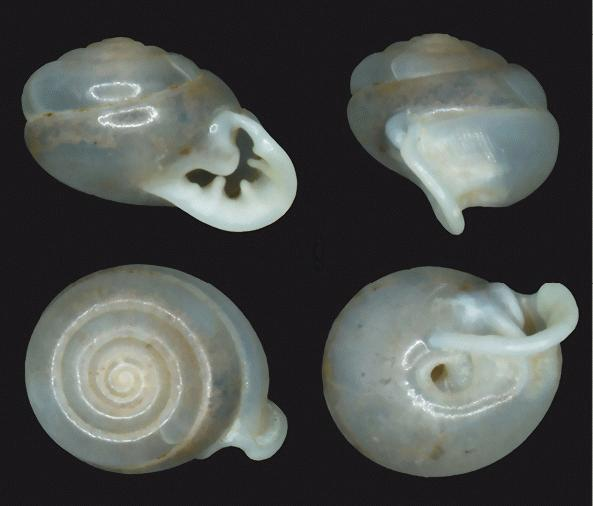
- Perrottetia phuphamanensis shell

Scientific classification
- Kingdom: Animalia
- Phylum: Mollusca
- Class: Gastropoda
- Order: Stylommatophora
- Family: Streptaxidae
- Genus: Perrottetia
- Species: P. phuphamanensis

Binomial name
- Perrottetia phuphamanensis Siriboon & Panha, 2013

= Perrottetia phuphamanensis =

Species of gastropod

Perrottetia phuphamanensis is a species of air-breathing land snail, a terrestrial pulmonate gastropod mollusc in the family Streptaxidae.

The specific name phuphamanensis is derived from the type locality Phu Pha Man National Park.

== Distribution ==
Location of the type locality

Distribution of Perrottetia phuphamanensis includes two localities in Khon Kaen Province in northeastern Thailand.

The type locality is Phu Pha Man National Park, Phu Pha Man District, Khon Kaen Province, Thailand, 16°45′34.0″N 101°57′50.3″E.

== Description ==
This species was described from Thailand in 2013 based on empty shells only.

The shell has 6–6½ whorls. The width of the shell is 6.8–8.1 mm. The height of the shell is 4.6–5.6 mm.

== Ecology ==
As of 2013 no living specimens have been found.

Species in the genus Perrottetia are carnivorous.
