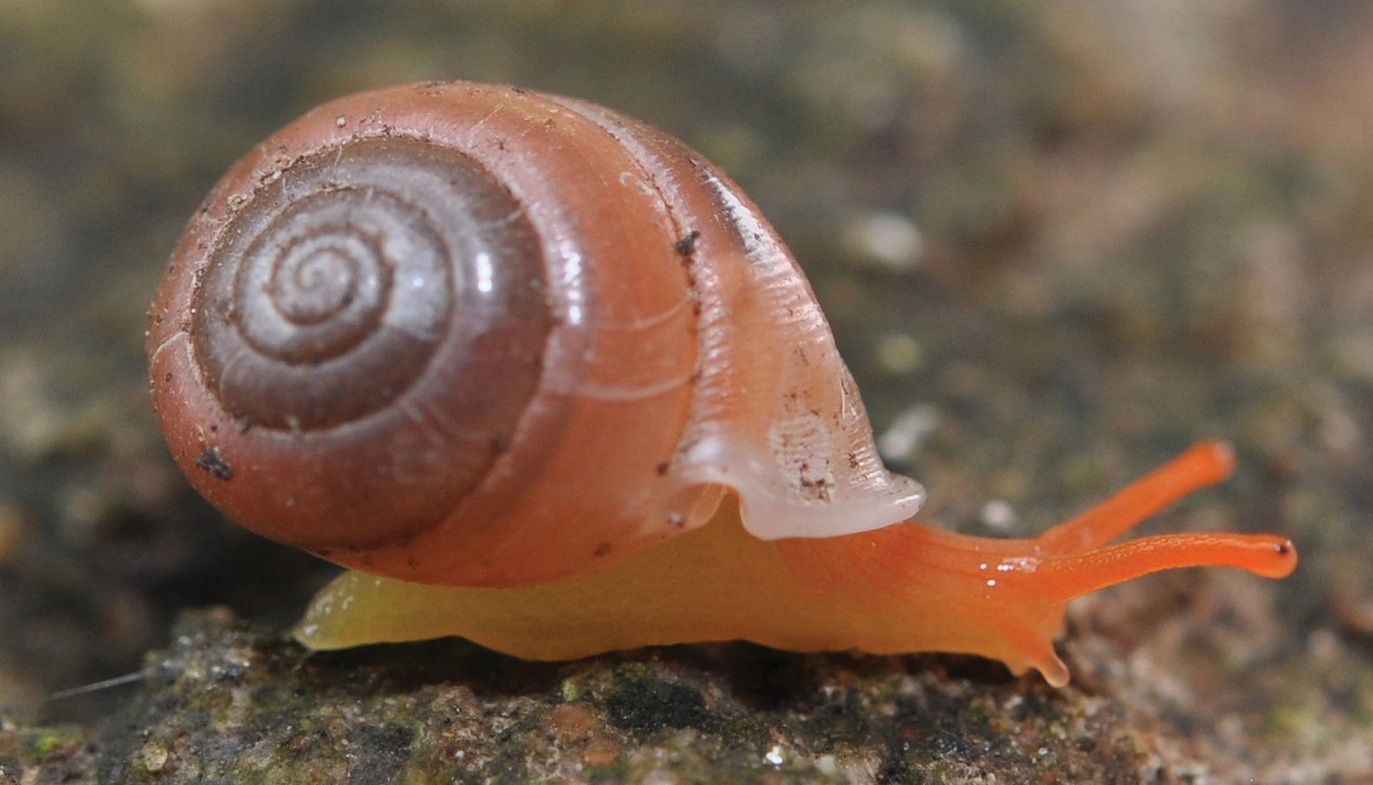
- Paratype of Perrottetia dermapyrrhosa from the type locality with the shell width about 7 mm.

Scientific classification
- Kingdom: Animalia
- Phylum: Mollusca
- Class: Gastropoda
- Order: Stylommatophora
- Family: Streptaxidae
- Genus: Perrottetia
- Species: P. dermapyrrhosa

Binomial name
- Perrottetia dermapyrrhosa Siriboon & Panha, 2013

= Perrottetia dermapyrrhosa =

Species of gastropod

Perrottetia dermapyrrhosa is a species of air-breathing land snail, a terrestrial pulmonate gastropod mollusc in the family Streptaxidae.

The specific name dermapyrrhosa is from the Greek “derma” meaning “skin” and “pyrrhos” meaning “red or yellowish-red”.

== Distribution ==
Location of the type locality.

Distribution of Perrottetia dermapyrrhosa include Thailand. It is known from the type locality only. The type locality is Wat Tam Namsrithong, Nong Kung Si District, Kalasin Province, Thailand, 16°48′18.0″N 103°16′42.5″E.

== Description ==
This species was described from Thailand in 2013 with a complete information on shell, radula and genitalia. Live specimens exhibit yellowish-red reticulated skin, and reddish tentacular retractor muscles are visible through the semi-transparent body.

The shell has 6–6½ whorls. The width of the shell is 7.4–8.1 mm. The height of the shell is 5.4–6.6 mm.

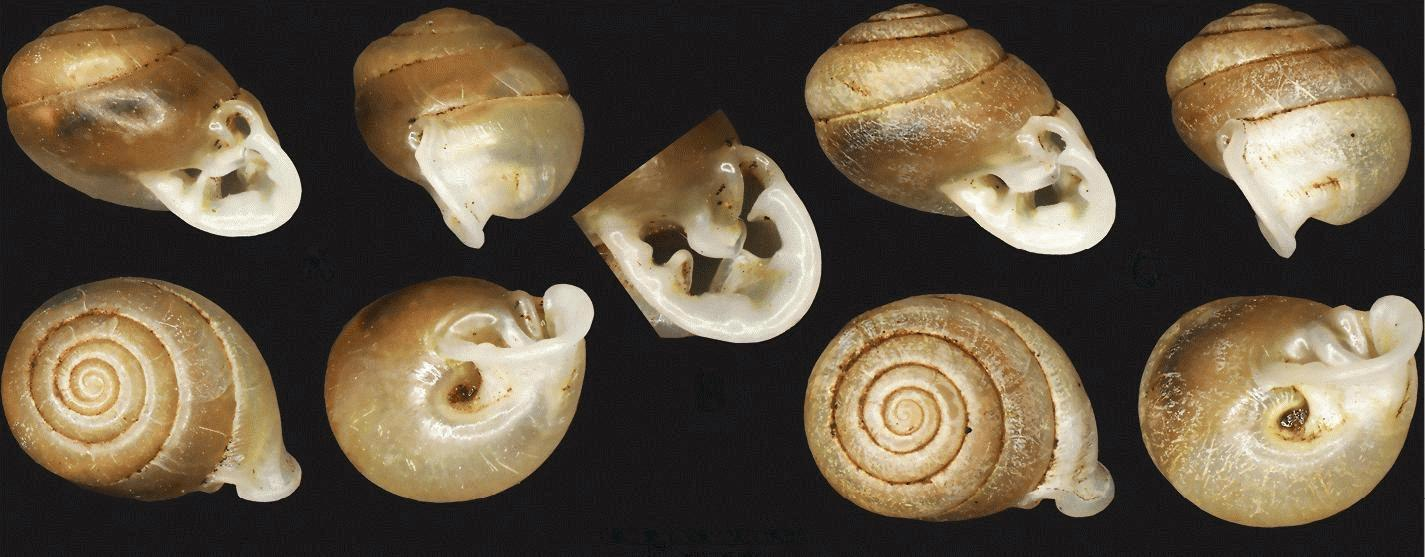
Perrottetia dermapyrrhosa shell. The left shell is holotype with the shell width 7.7 mm and the shell height 6.1 mm and the aperture of the holotype. The right shell is paratype.

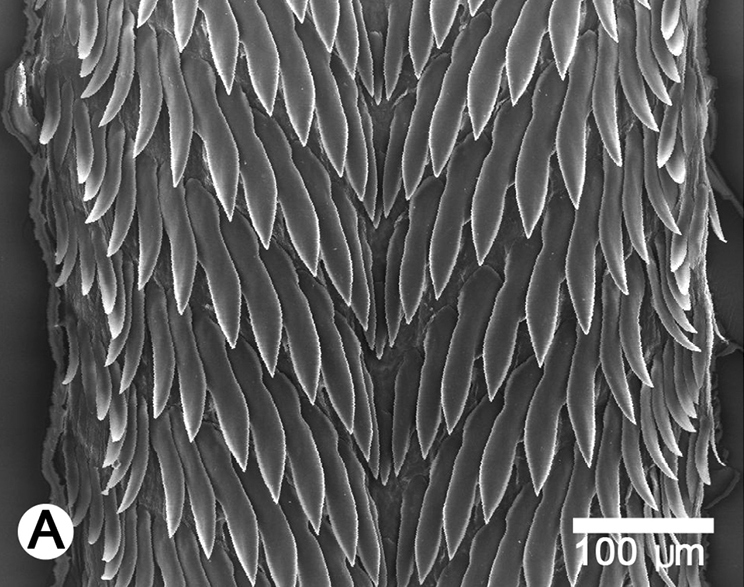
Radula of Perrottetia dermapyrrhosa.

Digestive system: Teeth of the radula are arranged in anteriorly V-shaped rows.

Reproductive system of Perrottetia dermapyrrhosa was described by Siriboon et al. in detail in 2013.

== Ecology ==
It lives in an isolated limestone hill reaching about 300 meters above mean sea level, and which is surrounded by the Korat Plateau.

Species in the genus Perrottetia are carnivorous.
