= Stramonita buchecki =

Scientific classification
- Kingdom: Animalia
- Phylum: Mollusca
- Class: Gastropoda
- Subclass: Caenogastropoda
- Order: Neogastropoda
- Superfamily: Muricoidea
- Family: Muricidae
- Subfamily: Rapaninae
- Genus: Stramonita
- Species: S. buchecki

Binomial name
- Stramonita buchecki Petuch, 2013

Species of gastropod

Stramonita buchecki is a species of sea snail, a marine gastropod mollusk, in the family Muricidae, the murex snails or rock snails.
