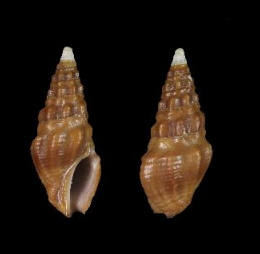
- Shells of Crassispira somalica (specimens at MNHN, Paris)

Scientific classification
- Kingdom: Animalia
- Phylum: Mollusca
- Class: Gastropoda
- Subclass: Caenogastropoda
- Order: Neogastropoda
- Superfamily: Conoidea
- Family: Pseudomelatomidae
- Genus: Crassispira
- Species: C. somalica

Binomial name
- Crassispira somalica Morassi & Bonfitto, 2013

= Crassispira somalica =

Species of gastropod

Crassispira somalica is a species of small predatory sea snail, a marine gastropod mollusk in the family Pseudomelatomidae.

== Description ==
The length of the shell attains 20 mm.

== Distribution ==
This marine species occurs off Somalia and is the first typical Crassispira species found off East Africa.
