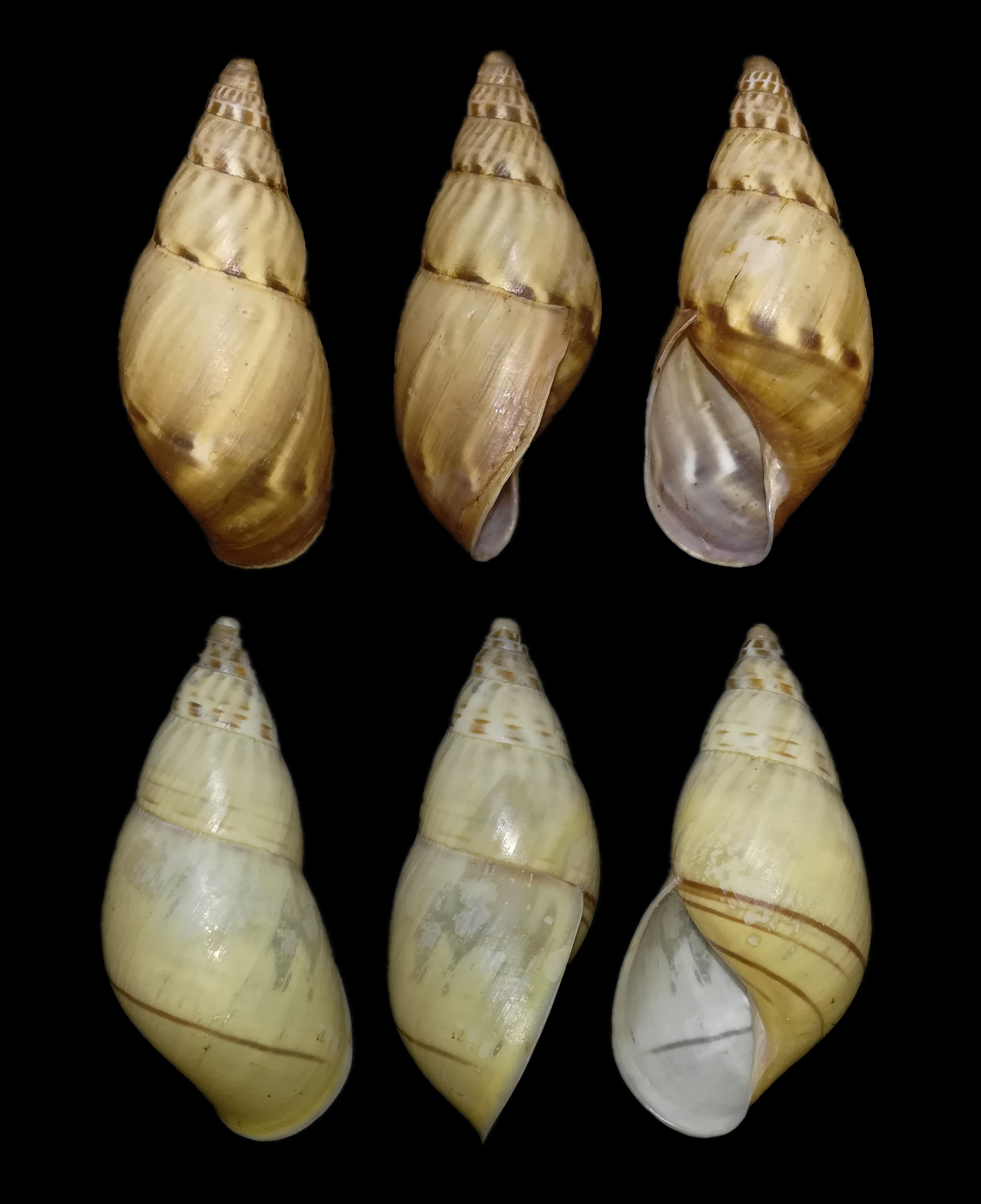

Scientific classification
- Kingdom: Animalia
- Phylum: Mollusca
- Class: Gastropoda
- Order: Stylommatophora
- Family: Camaenidae
- Genus: Amphidromus
- Species: A. abbasi

Binomial name
- Amphidromus abbasi S. Y. Chan & S. K. Tan, 2010

Synonyms
- Amphidromus (Syndromus) abbasi S. Y. Chan & S. K. Tan, 2010 alternative representation

= Amphidromus abbasi =

Species of gastropod

Amphidromus abbasi is a species of air-breathing land snail, a terrestrial pulmonate gastropod mollusc in the family Camaenidae.

Information about this species has been published in 2008 and the nomen nudum has been validated in 2010.

== Description ==
The height of the shell attains 41.3 mm, its diameter is 16 mm.

== Distribution ==
This species occurs in southwest Sumba, Lesser Sunda Islands, Indonesia.
