= Vexillum beitzi =

Scientific classification
- Kingdom: Animalia
- Phylum: Mollusca
- Class: Gastropoda
- Subclass: Caenogastropoda
- Order: Neogastropoda
- Superfamily: Turbinelloidea
- Family: Costellariidae
- Genus: Vexillum
- Species: V. beitzi

Binomial name
- Vexillum beitzi Salisbury & Gori, 2013

Synonyms
- Vexillum (Pusia) beitzi Salisbury & Gori, 2013

Species of gastropod

Vexillum beitzi is a species of sea snail, a marine gastropod mollusk, in the family Costellariidae, the ribbed miters.

== Description ==
The length of the shell attains 6 mm.

== Distribution ==
This marine species occurs off the Caroline Islands, Micronesia.
