= Gundlachtudora =

Scientific classification
- Kingdom: Animalia
- Phylum: Mollusca
- Class: Gastropoda
- Subclass: Caenogastropoda
- Order: Littorinimorpha
- Family: Pomatiidae
- Genus: Gundlachtudora; Torre & Bartsch, 1941

Genus of land snails

Gundlachtudora is a genus of land snails with an operculum, terrestrial gastropod mollusks in the family Pomatiidae.

== Species ==
Species within the genus Gundlachtudora include:

- Gundlachtudora decolorata (Gundlach in Pfeiffer, 1859)
