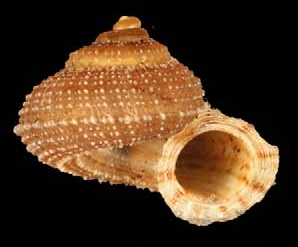
- Apertural view of a shell of Abbottella calliotropis

Scientific classification
- Domain: Eukaryota
- Kingdom: Animalia
- Phylum: Mollusca
- Class: Gastropoda
- Subclass: Caenogastropoda
- Order: Littorinimorpha
- Family: Pomatiidae
- Genus: Abbottella
- Species: A. calliotropis

Binomial name
- Abbottella calliotropis Watters, 2013

= Abbottella calliotropis =

Species of gastropod

Abbottella calliotropis is a species of operculate land snail, a terrestrial gastropod mollusc in the family Pomatiidae.

== Distribution ==
The distribution of Abbottella calliotropis is restricted to the Caribbean island of Hispaniola.
