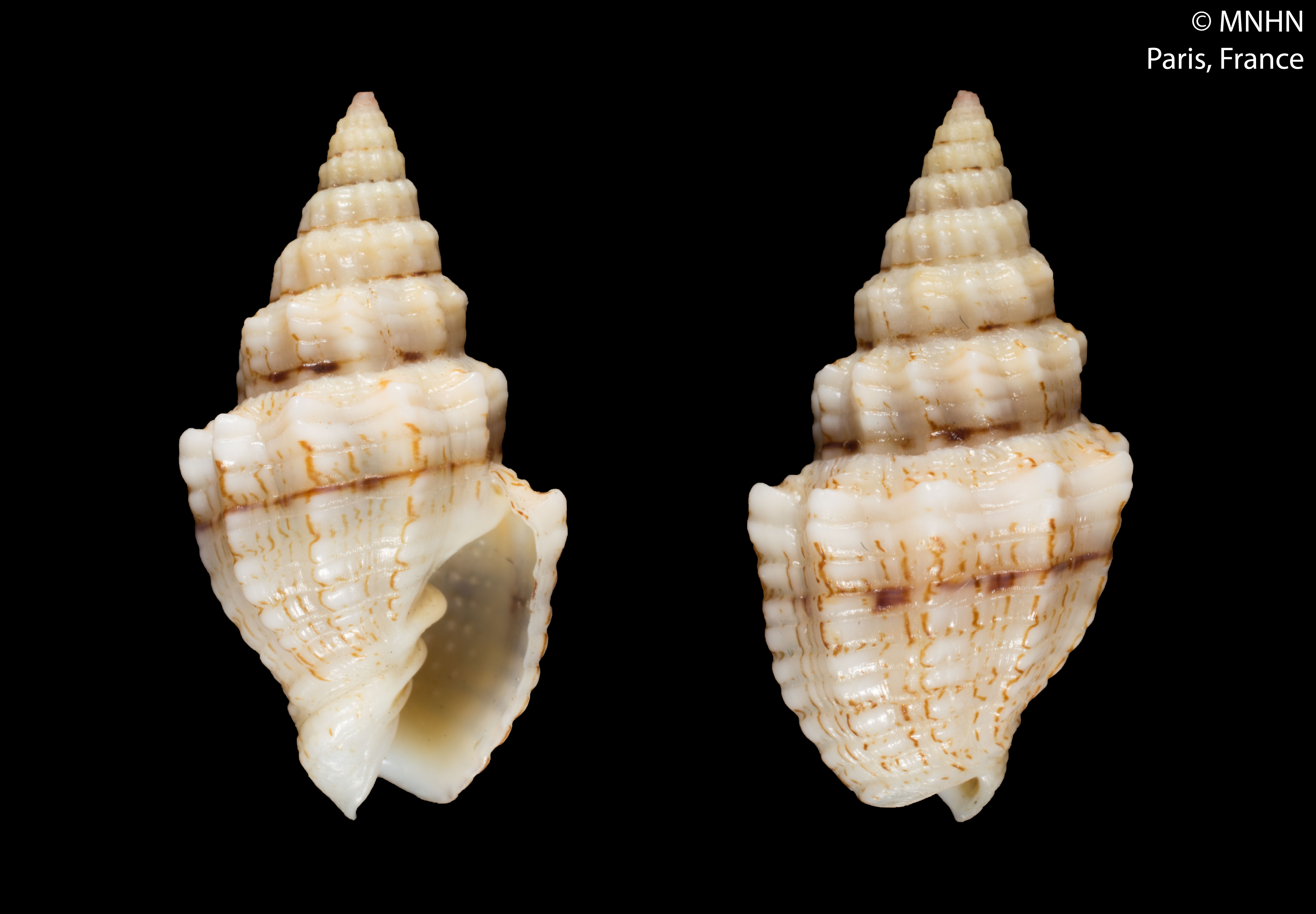
- Shell of Vexillum spiculum (holotype at MNHN, Paris)

Scientific classification
- Kingdom: Animalia
- Phylum: Mollusca
- Class: Gastropoda
- Subclass: Caenogastropoda
- Order: Neogastropoda
- Superfamily: Turbinelloidea
- Family: Costellariidae
- Genus: Vexillum
- Species: V. spiculum

Binomial name
- Vexillum spiculum Bozzetti, 2013

Synonyms
- Vexillum (Costellaria) spiculum Bozzetti, 2013

= Vexillum spiculum =

Species of gastropod

Vexillum spiculum is a species of sea snail, a marine gastropod mollusk, in the family Costellariidae, the ribbed miters.

== Description ==
The length of the shell attains 15 mm.

== Distribution ==
This marine species occurs off Madagascar.
