= Zemiropsis demertziae =

Scientific classification
- Kingdom: Animalia
- Phylum: Mollusca
- Class: Gastropoda
- Subclass: Caenogastropoda
- Order: Neogastropoda
- Family: Babyloniidae
- Genus: Zemiropsis
- Species: Z. demertziae

Binomial name
- Zemiropsis demertziae Fraussen & Rosado, 2013

Species of gastropod

Zemiropsis demertziae is a species of sea snail, a marine gastropod mollusk, in the family Babyloniidae.
