= Photocyte =

Cell that specializes in catalyzing enzymes to produce light

A photocyte is a type of cell that catalyses enzymatic reactions to produce light through bioluminescence. Photocytes are typically located within certain layers of epithelial tissue, functioning either individually, in groups, or as part of a larger light-producing organ known as a photophore. They contain distinctive structures called photocyte granules. These specialized cells occur in various multicellular animals, including coelenterates (such as cnidarians and ctenophores), annelids, arthropods (including insects), and fishes. Although some fungi exhibit bioluminescence, they do not possess specialized cells analogous to photocytes.

== Mechanism of light production ==
Nerve impulses may initiate light production by stimulating the photocyte to release the enzyme luciferase into a reaction chamber containing the substrate luciferin. In some species, this release occurs continuously without neural stimulation, through osmotic diffusion. Molecular oxygen is actively gated through surrounding tracheal cells, which normally limit oxygen diffusion from blood vessels. The subsequent reaction between oxygen, luciferase, and luciferin generates light energy and a byproduct, typically carbon dioxide. This biochemical reaction takes place within the peroxisome of the cell.

Early researchers proposed that adenosine triphosphate (ATP) served as the energy source for photocyte reactions. However, ATP produces only a small fraction of the energy generated by the luciferase reaction, making any resulting light emission too weak to be visible to the human eye. The wavelengths of light produced by most photocytes are centred around 490 nm, although emissions as energetic as 250 nm have been reported.

Variations in colour among different photocytes are typically caused by colour filters in other parts of the photophore, which modify the wavelength of the emitted light before it exits the endoderm. The visible colour range varies between bioluminescent species.

The specific combinations of luciferase and luciferin found in photocytes are unique to each species and are thought to result from evolutionary divergence.

== Anatomy and physiology ==
=== Firefly larvae ===
Light production in Photuris pensylvanica larvae occurs in approximately 2,000 photocytes located within the insect's highly innervated light organ, which is structurally simpler than that of the adult organism. The transparent photocytes are distinguishable from the opaque dorsal layer cells that cover them. Both nervous and intracellular mechanisms contribute to light production in these cells.

Fireflies can regulate the amount of oxygen travelling through their tracheal system to the light organ, thereby influencing oxygen availability for light emission. This regulation is achieved by modifying the quantity of fluid within the tracheal system. Because oxygen diffuses more slowly through water than through air, this mechanism allows fireflies to control the oxygen supply reaching the photocytes. Spiracles can also open and close to control the flow of air through the tracheal system, although this response typically occurs only under stress conditions.

==== Neural mechanism of light production ====
Experiments have shown that applying an electric current of 5 to 15 volts for 50 milliseconds to the segmental nerve innervating the light organ produces a glow approximately 1.5 seconds later, lasting for five to ten seconds. Stimulation of this nerve generates multiple impulses, with the frequency of impulses proportional to the intensity of stimulation. A higher frequency of impulses results in a consistent latency period, and continuous nerve activity corresponds with sustained light emission. Light intensity increases with impulse frequency up to around 30 impulses per second, beyond which no further increase in brightness occurs. This suggests physiological limitations within the synaptic or photocyte light-producing mechanisms.

A series of action potentials produces intermittent light flashes, with higher frequencies increasing the likelihood of light emission. Nerve impulses are associated with depolarization of the photocyte membrane, and stronger depolarization events correlate with brighter light output. The nerve innervating the light organ contains only two axons, but these branch repeatedly to reach numerous photocytes. Each cell is connected to several nerve terminals, and each terminal may be associated with multiple synapses.

The junction between the neuron and the photocyte differs from typical synaptic junctions between neurons or between neurons and muscle fibres in the neuromuscular junction. Depolarization in the photocyte following neural stimulation occurs about one hundred times more slowly than in these other junction types, a delay not attributable to diffusion limitations, as the synapse between the neuron and photocyte is relatively small. It has also been observed that the neurons controlling the light response terminate at tracheal cells rather than directly at the photocytes.

==== Intracellular mechanism ====
The resting potential of photocytes ranges between 50 and 65 millivolts. It is generally accepted that light emission follows depolarization of the photocyte membrane, although some studies suggest the reverse. Depolarization increases the diffusion rate of ions across the membrane and occurs approximately 0.5 seconds after a nerve impulse, reaching a peak at around one second. Higher frequencies of neural stimulation are associated with smaller depolarization events.

Exposure to certain neurotransmitters, including epinephrine, norepinephrine, and synephrine, can induce light emission without corresponding depolarization of the photocyte membrane.

=== Mnemiopsis leidyi ===
In Mnemiopsis leidyi, photocytes are unevenly distributed near the plate cilia cells. Gastric cells form a barrier that separates the photocytes from the openings of the radial canals along which they are located.

=== Porichthys ===
In Porichthys notatus, light production is triggered through an adrenergic mechanism. The sympathetic nervous system of the fish initiates bioluminescence in the photocytes. When stimulated by norepinephrine, epinephrine, or phenylephrine, the photocytes produce a brief flash of light followed by a gradual decrease in intensity. Stimulation with isoproterenol results only in a slow, fading illumination.

The amplitude of the initial flash, referred to as the "fast response", increases with higher concentrations of the stimulating neurotransmitter. Considerable variation in luminescence intensity has been observed among photocytes from different fish, as well as across seasons depending on when the samples were collected. Stimulation with phenylephrine produces a less intense response than stimulation with epinephrine or norepinephrine. Phentolamine has been shown to completely inhibit the effects of phenylephrine and partially inhibit those of epinephrine and norepinephrine. Clonidine suppresses the fast response but has no effect on the slow response.

The photocytes of Porichthys are known to be extensively innervated.

=== Amphiura filiformis ===
Mechanical stimulation of the arm spines can cause Amphiura filiformis to emit bioluminescent light in the blue range. The species has been found to possess a luciferase enzyme, which has been localized to clusters of photocytes situated at the tips of the arms and around the spines. Structures believed to be photocytes, based on available evidence, have also been identified near the spine nerve plexus, mucous cells, and probable pigment cells.

Bioluminescence in A. filiformis is controlled by the animal's nervous system. Acetylcholine can stimulate the photocytes through nicotinic receptors.

=== Amphipholis squamata ===
In Amphipholis squamata, bioluminescence originates from the arm spines, produced by photocytes located within the spinal ganglia. Acetylcholine has been shown to stimulate these photocytes to emit light.

=== Mollusks ===
Bioluminescent snails have been observed to exhibit a high degree of control over light emission, although the mechanism underlying this control remains unknown. Species within the genus Phuphania have been shown to retain their ability to produce light even after extended periods of hibernation. The means by which these snails maintain bioluminescent capability over long durations is not yet understood, though some hypotheses suggest it may be related to mechanisms observed in certain bioluminescent fungi.

=== Other species of fish ===
In many fish species, adrenaline has been found to stimulate photocytes to emit light. It is generally believed that impulses from the sympathetic nervous system provide the stimulus responsible for activating light production in these cells.

== Embryological development ==
=== Mnemiopsis leidyi ===
In Mnemiopsis leidyi, the ability to produce light first appears during the development of the plate cilia cells. The bioluminescent cells in the embryo share many characteristics with the photocytes observed in the adult organism. Cells of the M macromere lineage differentiate into photocytes and separate from other cell lineages during differential division.

The maturation of these photocytes and the intensification of light production occur rapidly, typically within ten hours of the initial observation of bioluminescence. The egg of M. leidyi contains two cytoplasmic regions: cortical and yolky. The cytoplasmic composition inherited by daughter cells during division influences their differentiation. Cortical cells produce light only if they inherit yolk in their cytoplasm; cells lacking yolk do not exhibit bioluminescence.

== Evolution of photocytes ==
Luciferin molecules are largely conserved across different species, whereas luciferase enzymes exhibit a greater degree of diversity. Approximately 80% of bioluminescent species are found in aquatic habitats.

=== Etmopterus spinax ===
The evolution of light-producing cells (photocytes) in sharks is believed to have occurred independently at least twice through convergent evolution. Evidence indicates that the bioluminescent properties of the shark Etmopterus spinax likely evolved as a form of camouflage, particularly for counter-illumination. However, luminescence on the lateral sides of the shark suggests additional functions beyond camouflage.

Bioluminescence is believed to have evolved only in sharks among the cartilaginous fishes. The specific functions of bioluminescence in sharks have not been fully determined.

=== Evolution in fireflies ===
All five families of luminescent beetles—Phengodidae, Rhagophthalidae, Elateridae, Sinopyrophoridae, and Lampyridae (fireflies)—are grouped within the Lampyroid clade. The luciferase enzymes and luciferin proteins expressed in the photocytes of fireflies are homologous to those found in beetle species within the families Phengodidae, Rhagophthalidae, and Elateridae (click beetles). Studies indicate that all bioluminescent beetle species investigated utilize highly similar mechanisms for light production in photocytes. The beetle genus Sinopyrophoridae is also bioluminescent, though the precise mechanism has not yet been fully characterized; it is believed to be homologous with other bioluminescent beetle genera.

The first complete genome of a bioluminescent beetle, Pyrocoelia pectoralis (a firefly), was sequenced in 2017. By 2018, the genomes of three additional bioluminescent beetle species had been sequenced. Bioluminescence in beetles serves multiple functions, including predator deterrence and mate attraction.

Variation in light colour among firefly species is largely attributed to differences in the amino acid sequences of luciferases expressed in their photocytes. Two luciferase gene types have been identified in firefly genomes: luc1-type and luc2-type. Evidence suggests that luc1-type evolved from a gene duplication of the gene encoding acyl-CoA synthetase. In click beetles, luciferase appears to have evolved independently from fireflies, likely through two separate gene duplications of the acyl-CoA synthetase gene, indicating analogy rather than homology between the groups. Additional genes associated with the storage of luciferin have also been identified.

=== Amphiura filiformis ===
Bioluminescence in Amphiura filiformis and other brittle star species is generally believed to serve as a defensive mechanism against predators. The light may attract predators to a specific arm, which the sea star can then autotomize, allowing the organism to escape predation.

=== Other species of fish ===
In many fish species, bioluminescence is primarily used for camouflage, helping individuals avoid predation. Bioluminescence is typically produced by endogenous photocytes rather than by symbiotic bacteria. In some cases, the light produced by photocytes may also serve as a means of intraspecific communication.

=== Mollusks ===
Bioluminescence has been observed in only three classes of Mollusca: Cephalopoda, Gastropoda, and Bivalvia. It is widespread among cephalopods but much less common in the other mollusk classes. Most bioluminescent mollusk species are marine, with the exception of the genera Latia and Quantula, which inhabit freshwater and terrestrial environments, respectively. More recent research has also documented bioluminescence in the genus Phuphania.

It is hypothesized that terrestrial mollusks use bioluminescence primarily as a defensive strategy to deter predators. The green light produced by their photocytes is believed to be the most visible color to nocturnal predators.

== Structure and organelles ==
In fireflies, mitochondria are believed to play a key role in regulating the supply of oxygen available for light production. An increased rate of cellular respiration reduces intracellular oxygen concentration, limiting the amount available for bioluminescence. Within photocytes, mitochondria are typically positioned near the cell periphery, whereas the peroxisome is located closer to the cell center. Not all bioluminescence in the firefly light organ occurs within photocyte granules; some fluorescent proteins have been identified in the posterior region of the organ.

=== Organelle targeting ===
In fireflies, the luciferase enzyme is localized to the peroxisome within photocytes. When mammalian cells were engineered to produce luciferase, the enzyme was similarly targeted to mammalian peroxisomes. This finding may provide insight into mechanisms of protein targeting to peroxisomes, which are not yet fully understood. High levels of luciferase expression can result in some enzyme remaining in the cytoplasm. The specific features of luciferase that direct it to the peroxisome are currently unknown, as no definitive peroxisome-targeting sequences have been identified.

=== Arachnocampa luminosa ===
Photocytes in Arachnocampa luminosa contain a circular nucleus and abundant ribosome, smooth endoplasmic reticulum, mitochondria, and microtubules. Unlike firefly photocytes, they do not contain granules; the luciferase reaction occurs in the cytoplasm. These cells lack a Golgi apparatus and rough endoplasmic reticulum and measure approximately 250 × 120 μm in area, with a depth of 25–30 μm.

=== Renilla köllikeri ===
Photocytes in Renilla köllikeri have diameters of 8–10 μm. Mitochondria are large with irregular cristae surrounding the nucleus. Rough endoplasmic reticulum is located near the cell membrane. The cytoplasm contains several small vesicles (~0.25 μm) and granules of various shapes and contents.

=== Amphipholis squamata ===
Photocytes in Amphipholis squamata contain a Golgi apparatus and rough endoplasmic reticulum, as well as up to six distinct types of vesicles within the cytoplasm.

== Signal transduction ==
Signal transduction pathways in firefly photocytes are thought to help regulate mitochondrial activity, making oxygen available for bioluminescence. Since the neurons controlling the light-producing mechanism terminate at the tracheal cells rather than directly on photocytes, an intermediary process is required to transmit the signal. Nitric oxide (NO) is believed to serve this role, as it is involved in various signaling processes across multiple animal taxa, including insects. Concentrations of NO around 70 ppm have been shown to induce flashing in fireflies, while the NO scavenger carboxy-PTIO inhibits this response. The tracheolar end organ contains high levels of nitric oxide synthase, and NO has been implicated in decreasing mitochondrial respiration. The effect of NO on mitochondria is influenced by ambient light, with higher light levels reducing NO activity and lower light levels enhancing it. Light produced by the photocytes can also inhibit NO activity.

Firefly photocytes contain a vacuole that participates in signaling with the extracellular environment. Octopamine activates adenylate cyclase, which contributes to triggering bioluminescence. The reaction between D-luciferin, luciferase, and ATP is central to light production in firefly photocytes. Fluorescent responses are greater under basic conditions than under acidic conditions.

== Granules ==
Photocyte granules vary in shape from roughly spherical to elliptical, and three distinct types have been identified. The bioluminescent reaction occurs within these granules. In the larval photocytes of Photuris pennsylvanica, granules range from 0.6 to 2.5 μm, whereas in adult photocytes of Asiatic fireflies, they measure between 2.5 and 4.5 μm. The size and shape of photocytes, as well as their granules, exhibit considerable diversity among species. Multiple types of granules can coexist within a single photocyte. Light emission is confined to the granules where the reaction takes place.

=== Type I ===
Type I granules contain between two and twelve microtubules. Their matrix lacks a uniform shape or structure, with ferritin distributed throughout.

=== Type II ===
Type II granules contain a large crystal surrounded by several smaller crystals within a matrix of indeterminate shape. Microtubules are associated with the faces of the crystals, and ferritin is also found in association with the crystals. Type II granules are hypothesized to occur in the photocytes of Amphiura filiformis.

=== Type III ===
Type III granules are characterized by multiple thick-walled tubules. Ferritin within these granules is associated with filament-like structures contained in the matrix.

== Identification techniques and culturing ==
Photocytes in organisms can be identified using fluorescence, as the compounds responsible for bioluminescence typically exhibit fluorescent properties.
