= Phuphania globosa =

Scientific classification
- Kingdom: Animalia
- Phylum: Mollusca
- Class: Gastropoda
- Order: Stylommatophora
- Suborder: Helicina
- Infraorder: Limacoidei
- Superfamily: Trochomorphoidea
- Family: Dyakiidae
- Genus: Phuphania
- Species: P. globosa

Binomial name
- Phuphania globosa Tumpeesuwan, Naggs & Panha, 2007

Species of gastropod

Phuphania globosa is a species of air-breathing land snail in the family Dyakiidae. The species is bioluminescent as with other members of its genus.

The generic name Phuphania derives from the Phu Phan Mountains, where the snails come from. While the specific name globosa is a Latin word which means "spherical" or "globose".

== Distribution ==
This snail is native to the Phu Phan Mountains in northeastern Thailand.

== Shell description ==
The shell is dextral, and it has 5¾ whorls. The height of the shell is 34.08 mm. The width of the shell is 28.70 mm.

== Bioluminescence ==
This species continuously emits a green glow due to light-emitting cells found all over the entire mantle and foot.
