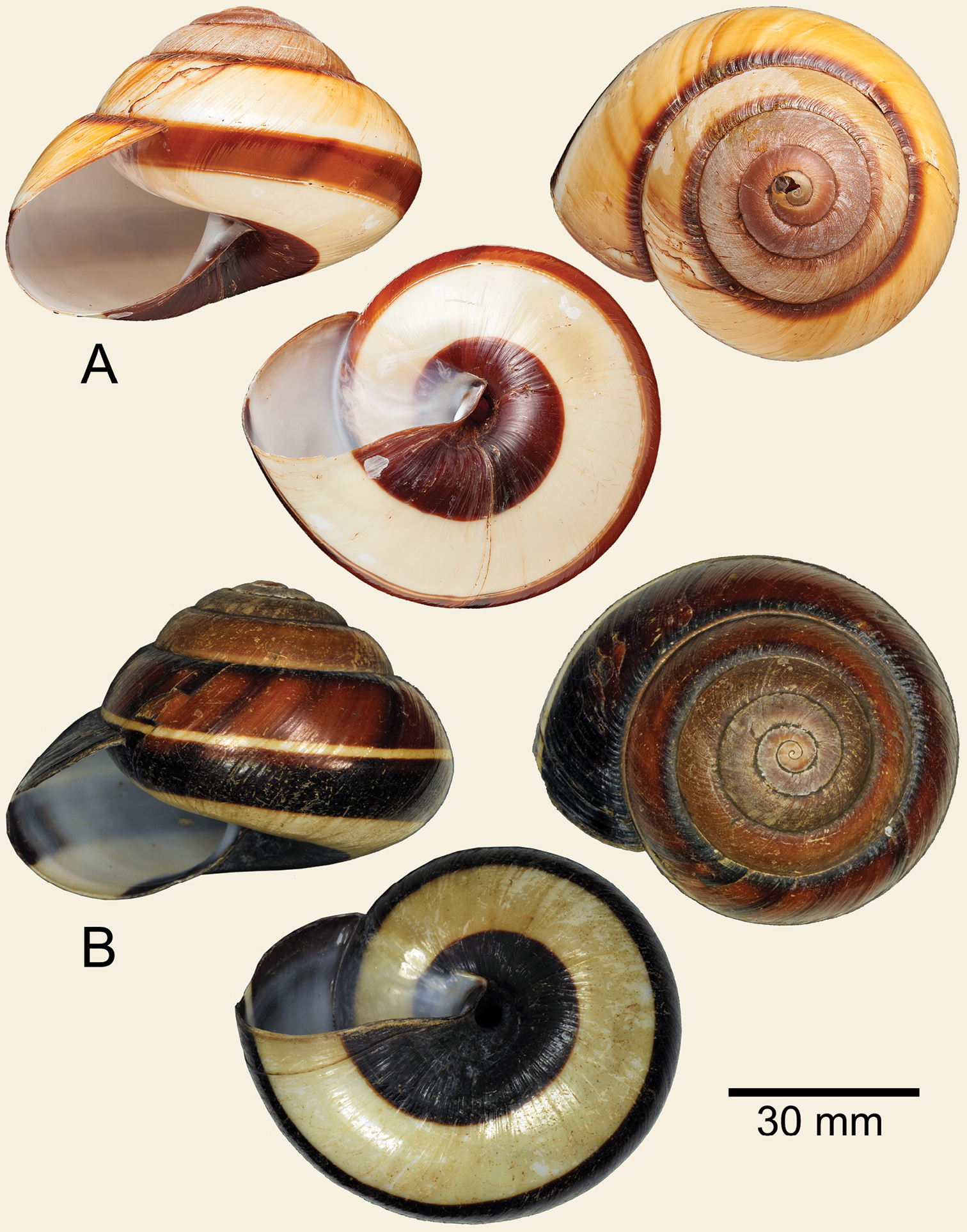

Conservation status
- Critically Endangered (IUCN 3.1)

Scientific classification
- Kingdom: Animalia
- Phylum: Mollusca
- Class: Gastropoda
- Order: Stylommatophora
- Family: Dyakiidae
- Genus: Bertia
- Species: B. cambojiensis

Binomial name
- Bertia cambojiensis (Reeve, 1860)

Synonyms
- Helix cambojiensis Reeve, 1860; Helix mouhoti Reeve, 1860

= Bertia cambojiensis =

Species of gastropod

Bertia cambojiensis, also known as Vietnamese giant snail or Vietnamese giant magnolia snail, is a critically endangered species of air-breathing land snail, recorded from Cambodia and southern Vietnam. It is a terrestrial pulmonate gastropod mollusc in the family Dyakiidae.
