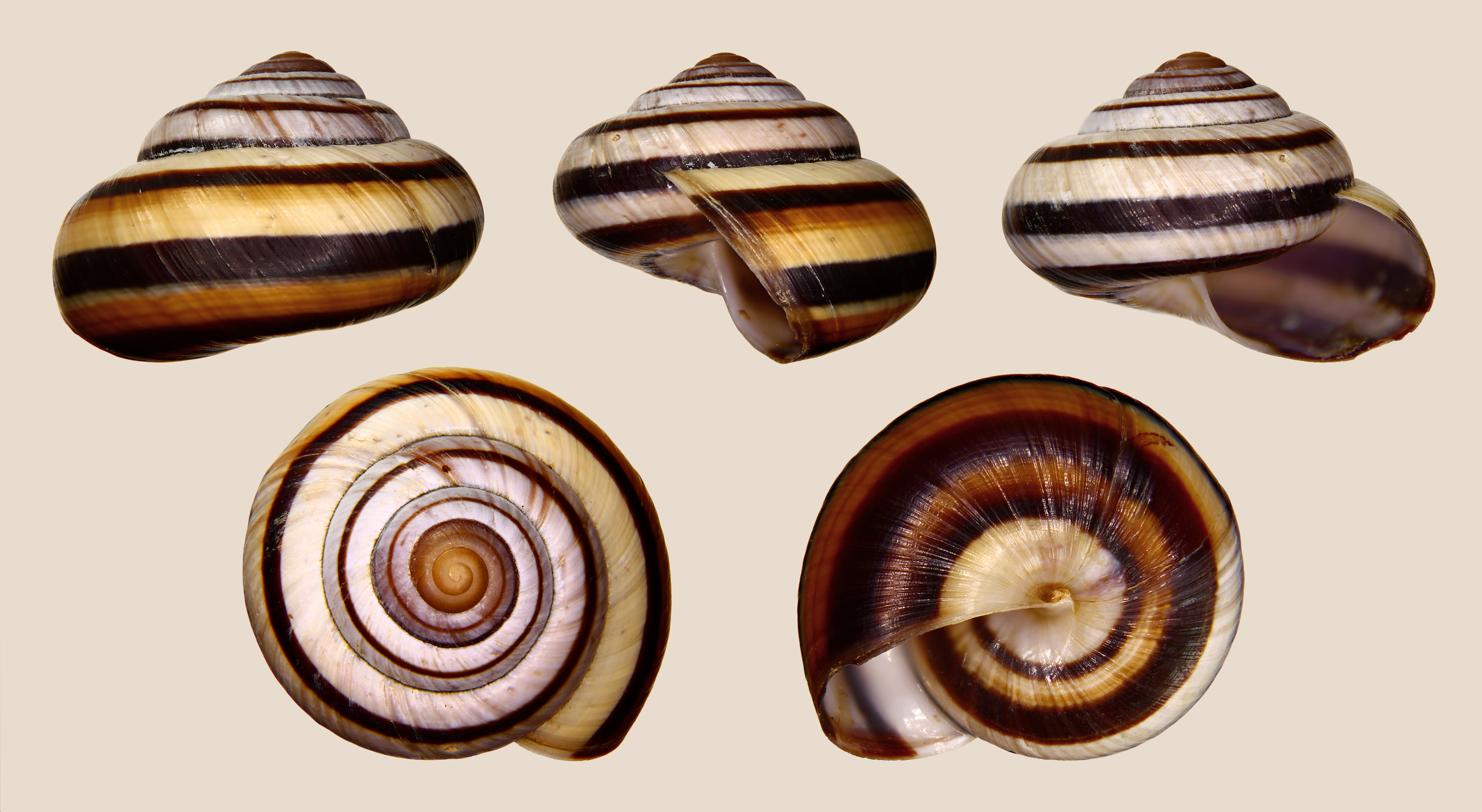
- Asperitas inquinata penidae

Scientific classification
- Domain: Eukaryota
- Kingdom: Animalia
- Phylum: Mollusca
- Class: Gastropoda
- Order: Stylommatophora
- Infraorder: Limacoidei
- Superfamily: Trochomorphoidea
- Family: Dyakiidae
- Genus: Asperitas; Gray, 1857

Type species
- Xestina rugosissima Möllendorff, 1903

= Asperitas =

Genus of gastropods

Asperitas is a genus of air-breathing land snails, terrestrial pulmonate gastropod mollusks in the family Dyakiidae.

== Species ==
The genus Asperitas include:

(verify species/subspecies taxonomic rank)

- Asperitas abbasi (Thach, 2016)
- Asperitas abbasi Thach, 2018 (taxon inquirendum) (secondary homonym of Asperitas abbasi (Thach, 2016), junior synonym of Asperitas trochus (O. F. Müller, 1774))
- Asperitas badjavensis Rensch, 1930
- Asperitas bimaensis (Mousson, 1849) - photo Asperitas bimaensis (Schepman, 1892)
  - Asperitas bimaensis abbasianus Parsons, 2019
  - Asperitas bimaensis bimaensis (Mousson, 1849)
  - Asperitas bimaensis cochlostyloides (Schepman, 1892)
  - Asperitas bimaensis halata (Mousson, 1849): junior synonym of Asperitas trochus (O. F. Müller, 1774)
  - Asperitas bimaensis johnabbasi Thach, 2020
  - Asperitas bimaensis liei Thach, 2018: junior synonym of Asperitas trochus (O. F. Müller, 1774)
  - Asperitas bimaensis soembaensis (Schepman, 1892)
  - Asperitas bimaensis subpolita (E.A. Smith, 1897)
  - Asperitas bimaensis viridis (Schepman, 1892)
- Asperitas coffea (L. Pfeiffer, 1855)
- Asperitas colorata (Mousson, 1849)
  - Asperitas colorata komodoensis Haltenorth & Jaeckel, 1940 - Komodo asperitas snail
- Asperitas everetti E. A. Smith, 1897
  - Asperitas everetti notabilis (Rensch, 1930)
- Asperitas inquinata (von dem Busch, 1842)
  - Asperitas inquinata moussoni (Pfeiffer, 1849)
  - Asperitas inquinata penidae (von dem Busch, 1842)
- Asperitas nemorensis Müller, 1774
- Asperitas notabilis (Rensch, 1930)
- Asperitas polymorpha E. A. Smith, 1884
- Asperitas rookmaakeri (B. Rensch, 1930)
- Asperitas rugosissima (Moellendorff, 1903) - the type species
- Asperitas serpentina B. Rensch, 1934
- Asperitas sparsa Mousson, 1854
  - Asperitas sparsa baliensis Mousson, 1857
- Asperitas trochus Müller, 1774 - trochoid asperitas snail
  - Asperitas trochus melanoraphe
  - Asperitas trochus parvinsularis
  - Asperitas trochus penidae Rensch, 1839
  - Asperitas trochus polymorpha
  - Asperitas trochus pseudonemorensis
  - Asperitas trochus rareguttata
  - Asperitas trochus trochus
- Asperitas waandersiana (Mousson, 1857) / Asperitas trochus waandersiana Mousson, 1857 -

Species brought into synonymy

- Asperitas cidaris (Lamarck, 1822): synonym of Asperitas trochus (O. F. Müller, 1774) (junior synonym)
- Asperitas rareguttata Mousson, 1849: synonym of Asperitas trochus (O. F. Müller, 1774) (junior synonym)
  - Asperitas rareguttata crebiguttata / Asperitas crebiguttata Von Martens, 1867
- Asperitas stuartiae (Sowerby in Pfeiffer, 1845): synonym of Asperitas trochus (O. F. Müller, 1774) (junior synonym)
  - Asperitas stuartiae hadiprajitnoi Dharma, 1999: synonym of Asperitas trochus (O. F. Müller, 1774) (junior synonym)
  - Asperitas stuartiae yani Dharma, 1999: synonym of Asperitas trochus (O. F. Müller, 1774) (junior synonym)

photo

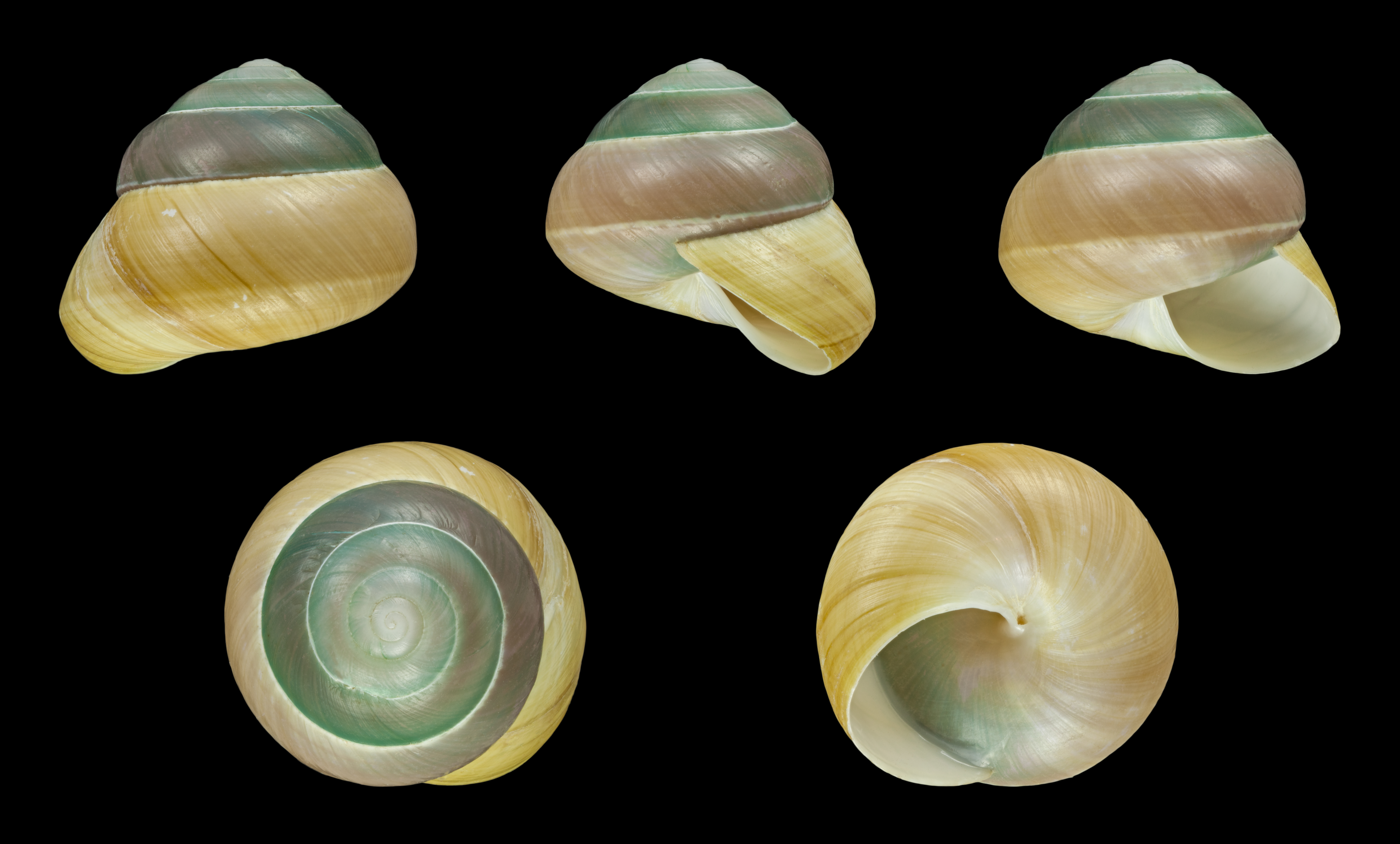
Asperitas bimaensis cochlostyloides

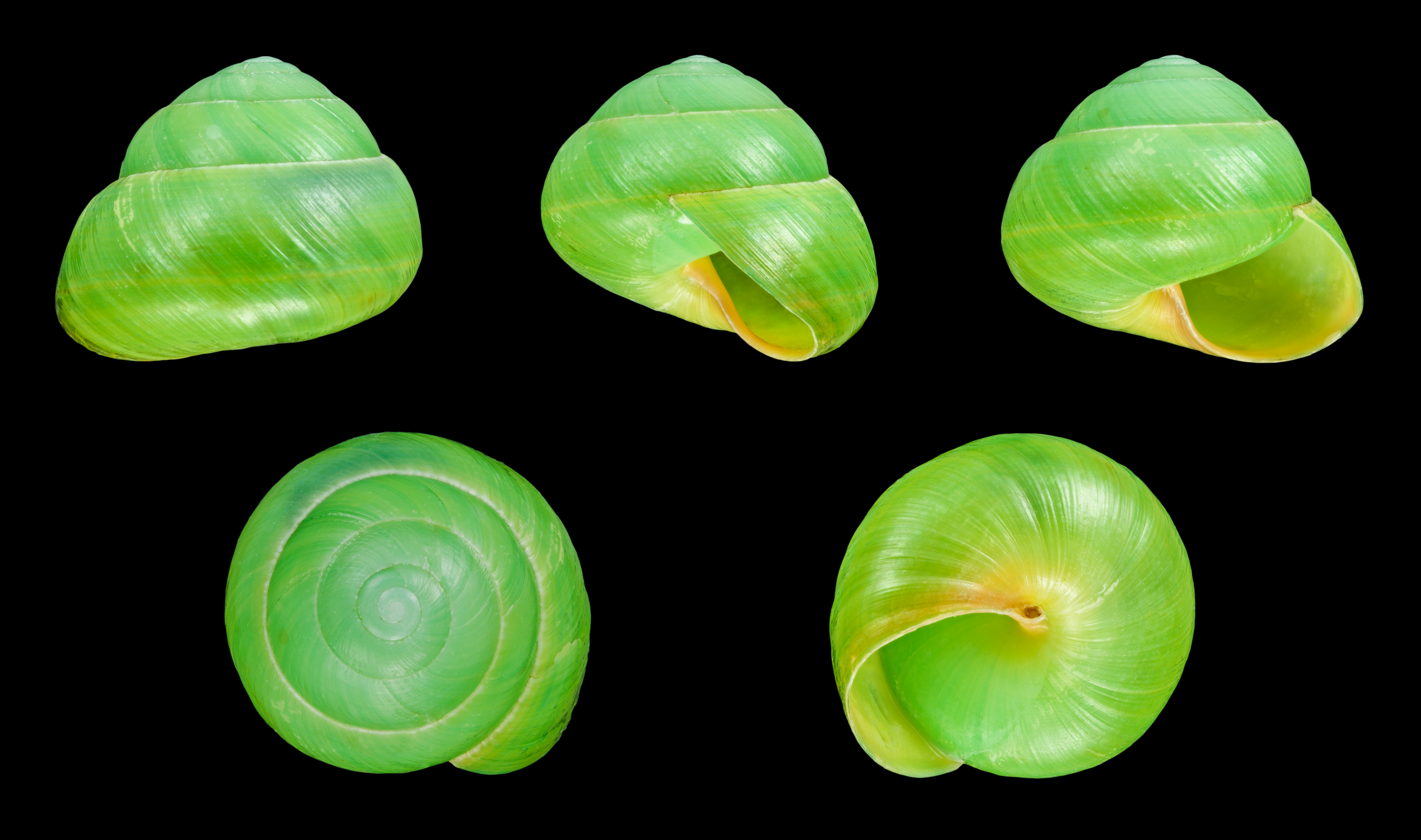
Asperitas bimaensis cochlostyloides viridis

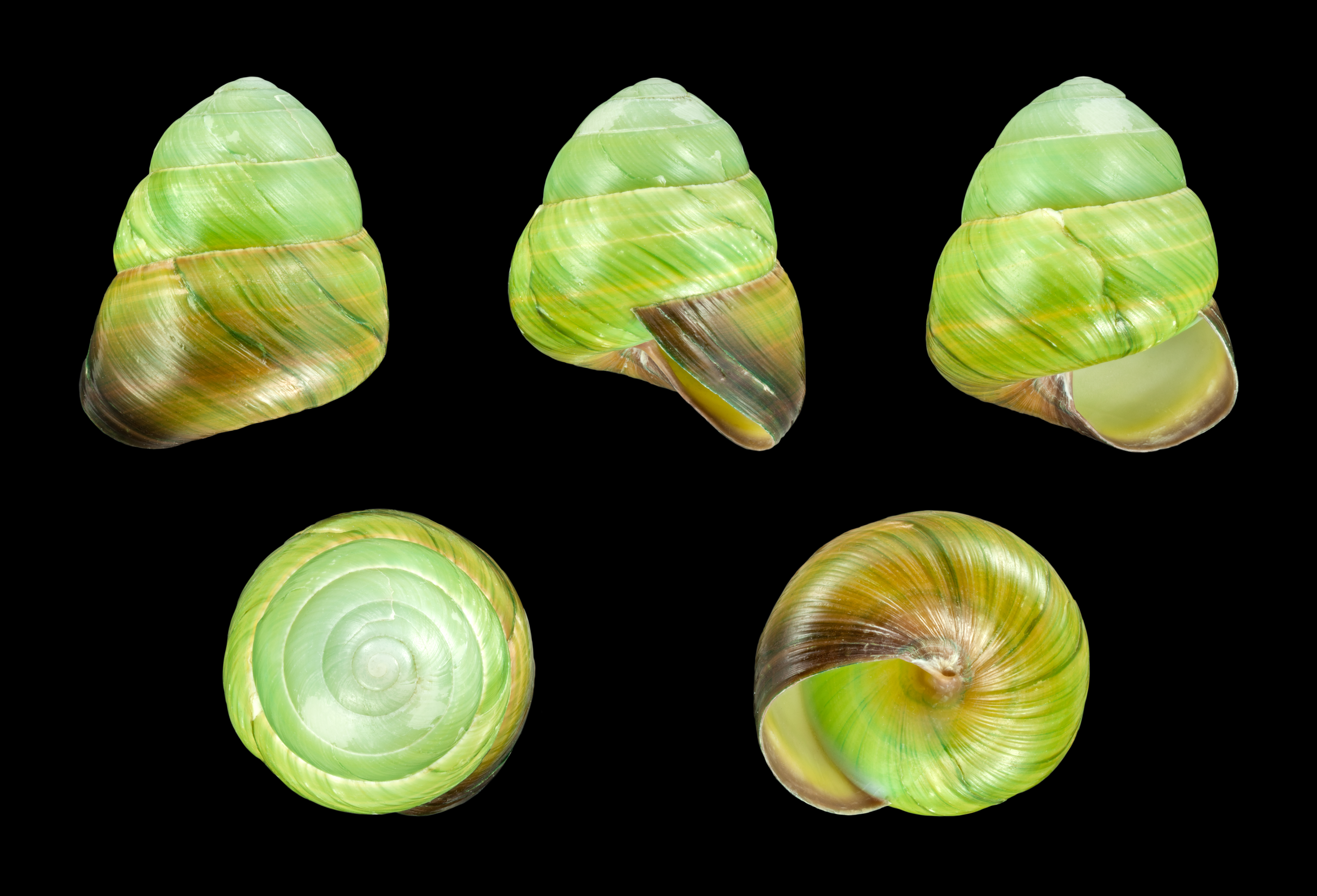
Asperitas bimaensis halata

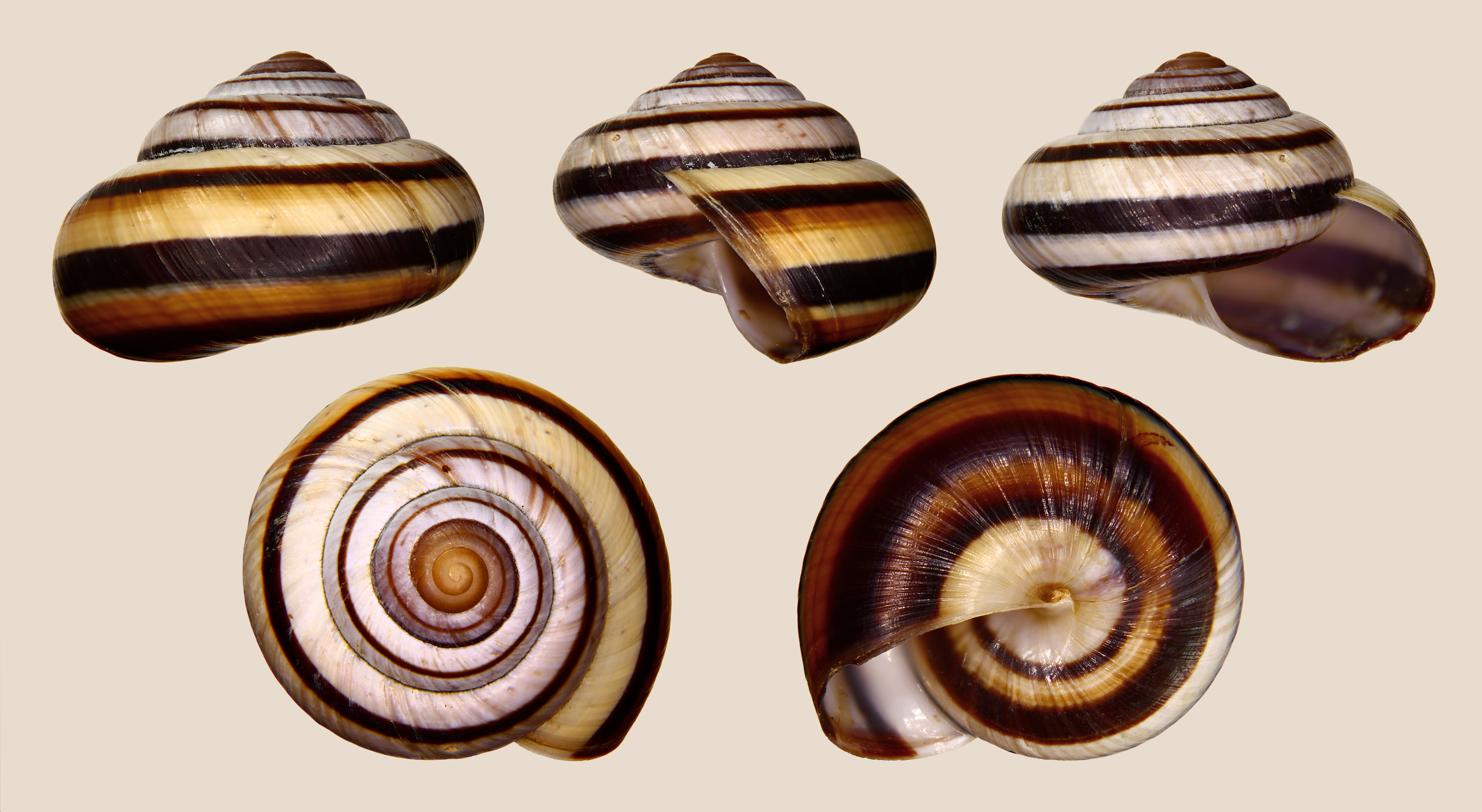
Asperitas inquinata penidae

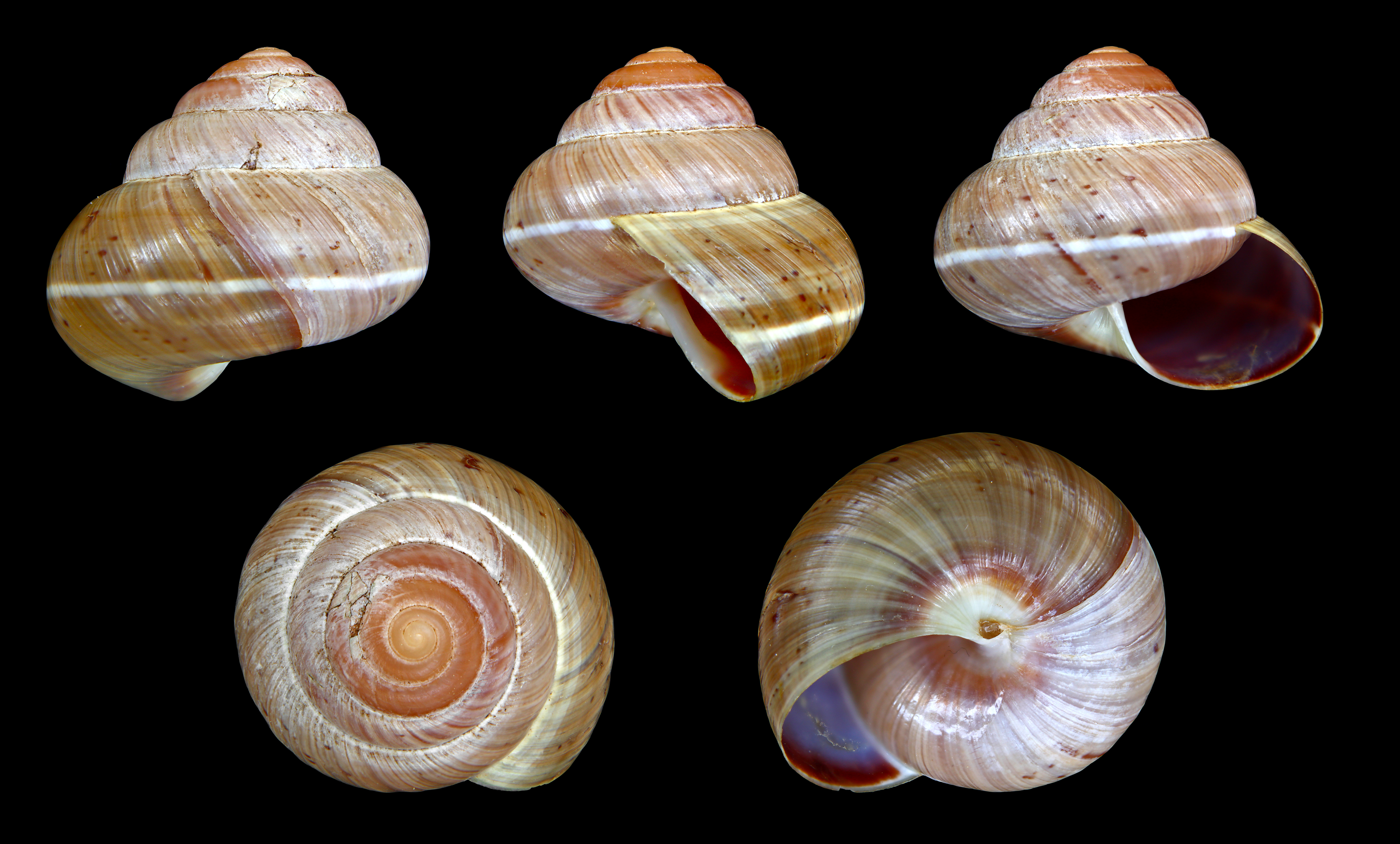
Asperitas sparsa

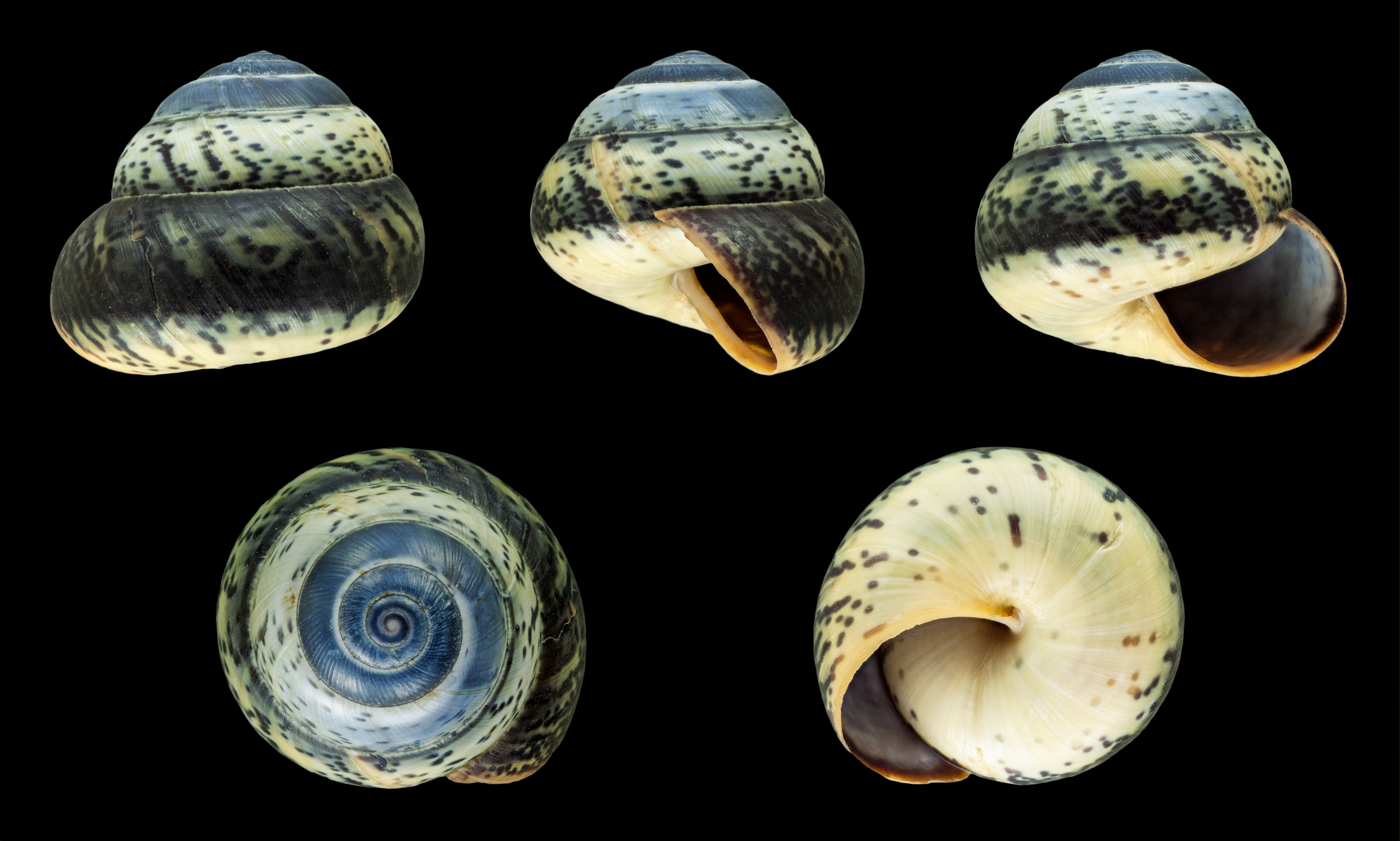
Asperitas trochus polymorpha
