= Dyakia =

Dyakia is the scientific name for two genera of organisms and may refer to:

- Dyakia (gastropod), a genus of land snails in the family Dyakiidae
- Dyakia (plant), a genus of orchids in the subtribe Aeridinae
