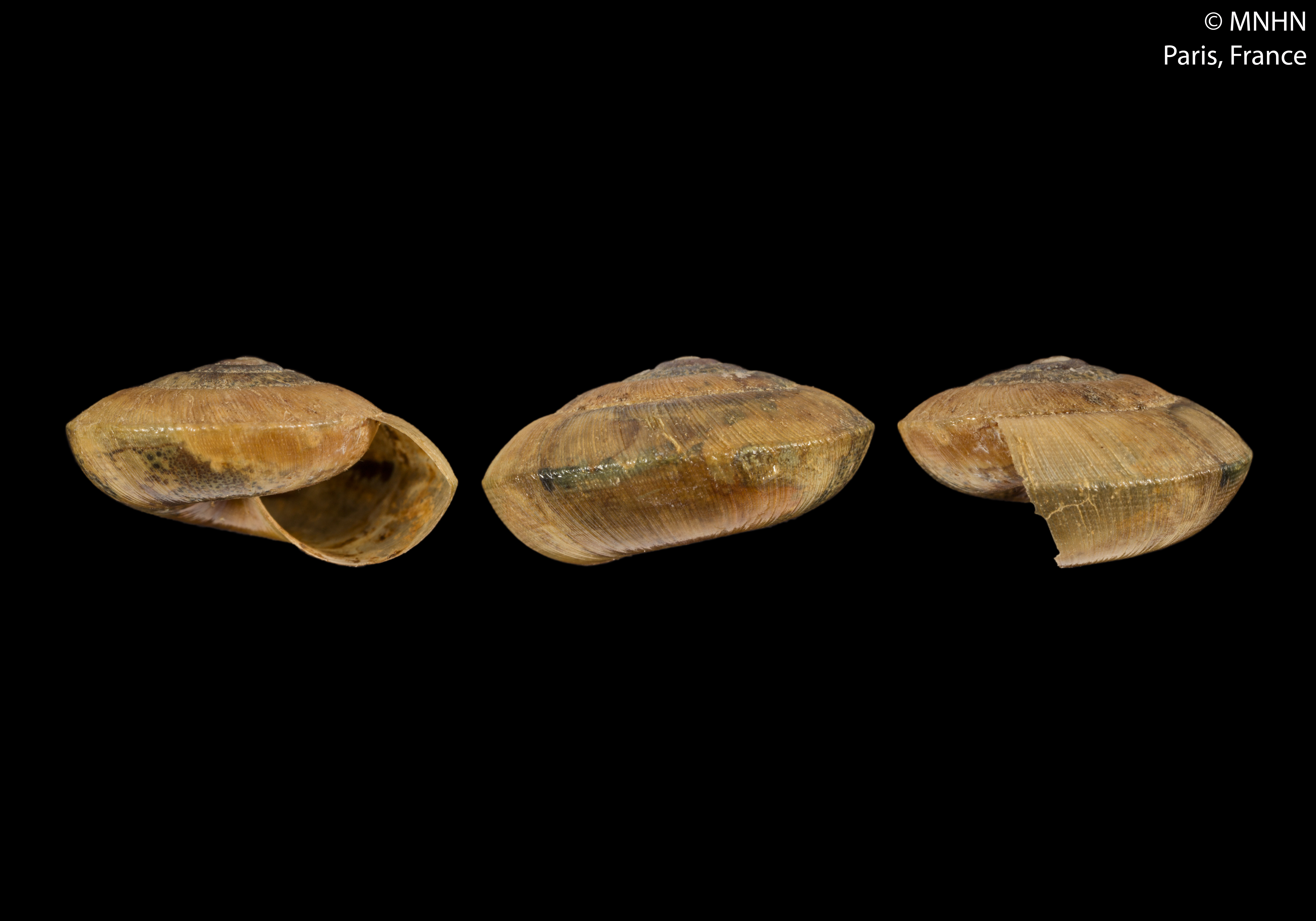
- Shell of Pseudoplecta bijuga (syntype at MNHN, Paris)

Scientific classification
- Domain: Eukaryota
- Kingdom: Animalia
- Phylum: Mollusca
- Class: Gastropoda
- Order: Stylommatophora
- Infraorder: Limacoidei
- Superfamily: Trochomorphoidea
- Genus: Pseudoplecta; Laidlaw, 1932
- Species: P. bijuga

Binomial name
- Pseudoplecta bijuga (Stoliczka, 1873)

= Pseudoplecta =

Genus of gastropod

Pseudoplecta is a monotypic genus of air-breathing land snails, terrestrial pulmonate gastropod mollusks in the subfamily Trochomorphoidea of the family Dyakiidae.

Its sole member is the species Pseudoplecta bijuga, which may be endemic to Thailand and Malaysia.
