= Bertia =

Bertia is the scientific name of two genera of organisms and may refer to:

- Bertia (fungus), a genus of fungi in the family Bertiaceae
- Bertia (gastropod), a genus of snails in the family Dyakiidae
