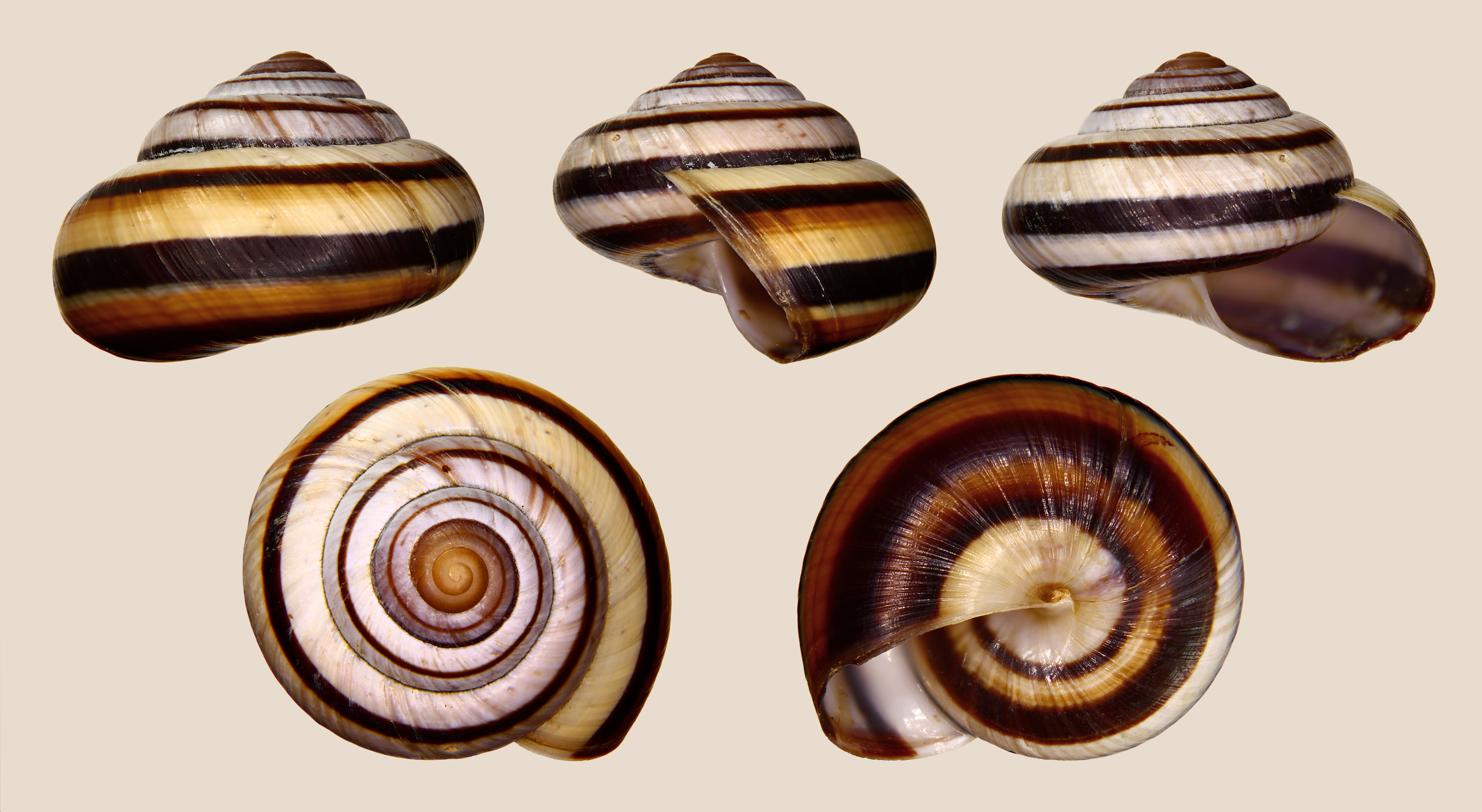
- Five views of one shell of Asperitas inquinata penindae

Scientific classification
- Domain: Eukaryota
- Kingdom: Animalia
- Phylum: Mollusca
- Class: Gastropoda
- Order: Stylommatophora
- Family: Dyakiidae
- Genus: Asperitas
- Species: A. inquinata

Binomial name
- Asperitas inquinata (Von dem Busch, 1842)

Subspecies
- See text

= Asperitas inquinata =

Species of gastropod

Asperitas inquinata is a species of air-breathing land snail, a terrestrial gastropod mollusk in the family Dyakiidae. This species has two subspecies: Asperitas inquinata moussoni and Asperitas inquinata penidae.

This snail is found in Indonesia and Bali, with the subspecies A. inquinata penidae being found also on Penida Island.
