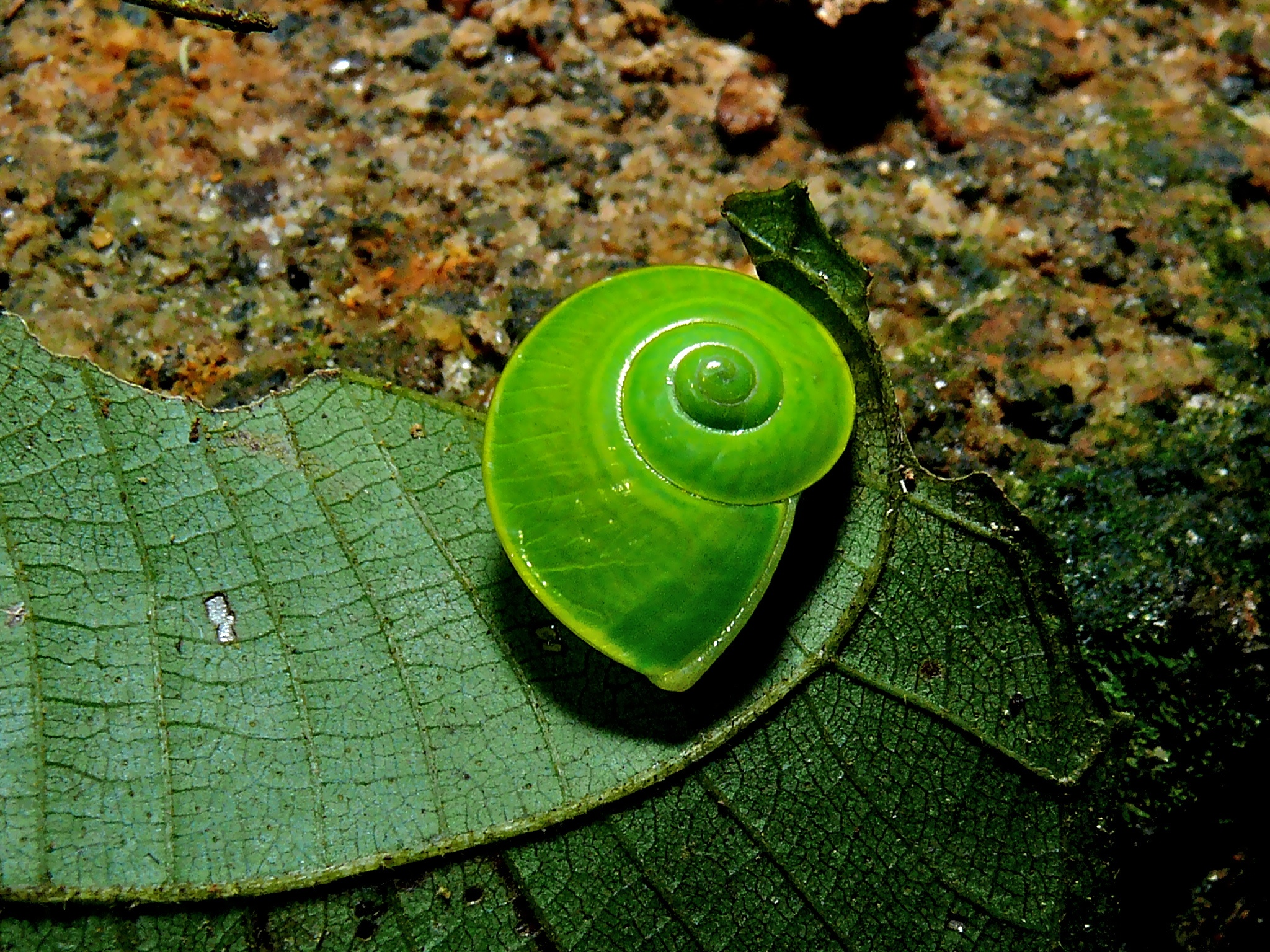

Scientific classification
- Kingdom: Animalia
- Phylum: Mollusca
- Class: Gastropoda
- Order: Stylommatophora
- Family: Dyakiidae
- Genus: Rhinocochlis; Thiele, 1931
- Species: R. nasuta

Binomial name
- Rhinocochlis nasuta (Metcalfe, 1851)

= Rhinocochlis =

Genus of gastropods

Rhinocochlis nasuta is a species of air-breathing land snails, terrestrial pulmonate gastropod molluscs in the family Dyakiidae.

Rhinocochlis nasuta is the only species in the genus Rhinocochlis.
