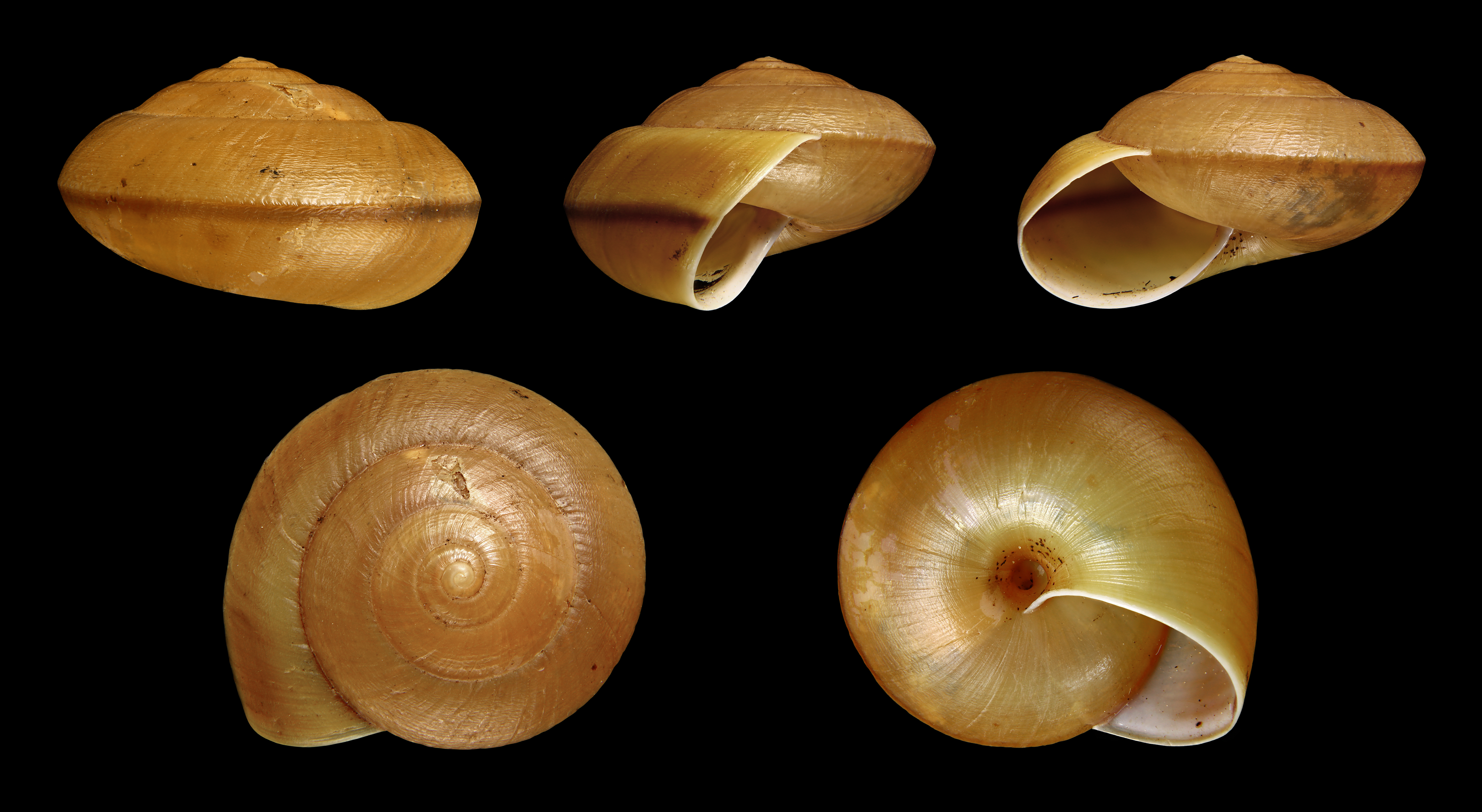
- Five views of a shell of Dyakia salangana

Scientific classification
- Kingdom: Animalia
- Phylum: Mollusca
- Class: Gastropoda
- Order: Stylommatophora
- Family: Dyakiidae
- Genus: Dyakia
- Species: D. sangana

Binomial name
- Dyakia sangana (Martens, 1883)

= Dyakia salangana =

Species of gastropod

Dyakia salangana is a species of air-breathing land snail, a terrestrial pulmonate gastropod mollusk in the family Dyakiidae.

The shell of this species is sinistral (left-handed) in coiling.
