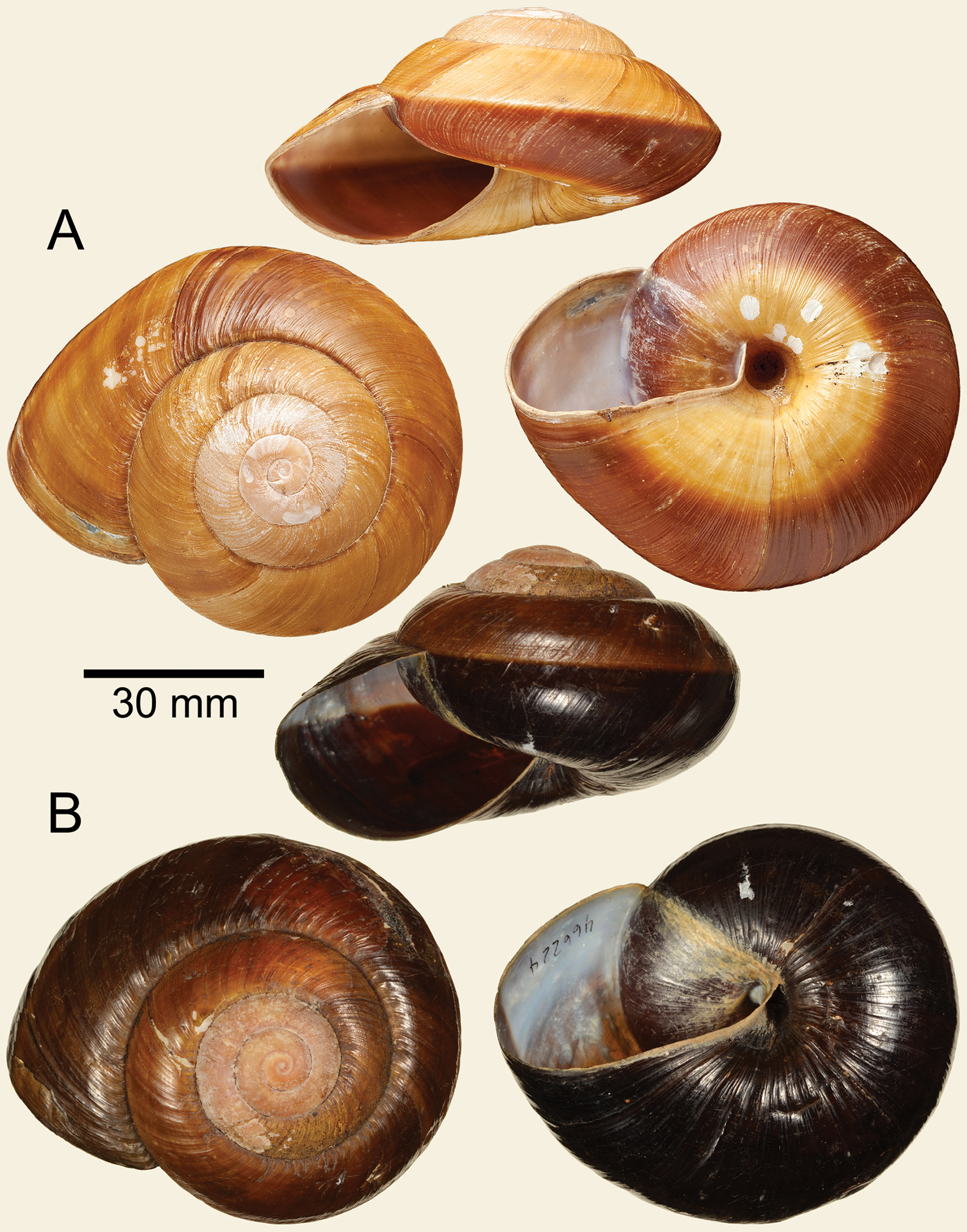

Scientific classification
- Kingdom: Animalia
- Phylum: Mollusca
- Class: Gastropoda
- Order: Stylommatophora
- Infraorder: Limacoidei
- Superfamily: Trochomorphoidea
- Family: Dyakiidae
- Genus: Bertia; Ancey, 1887

= Bertia (gastropod) =

Genus of snails

Bertia is a genus of air-breathing Asian land snails: they are pulmonate gastropod molluscs in the family Dyakiidae.

== Distribution and conservation status ==
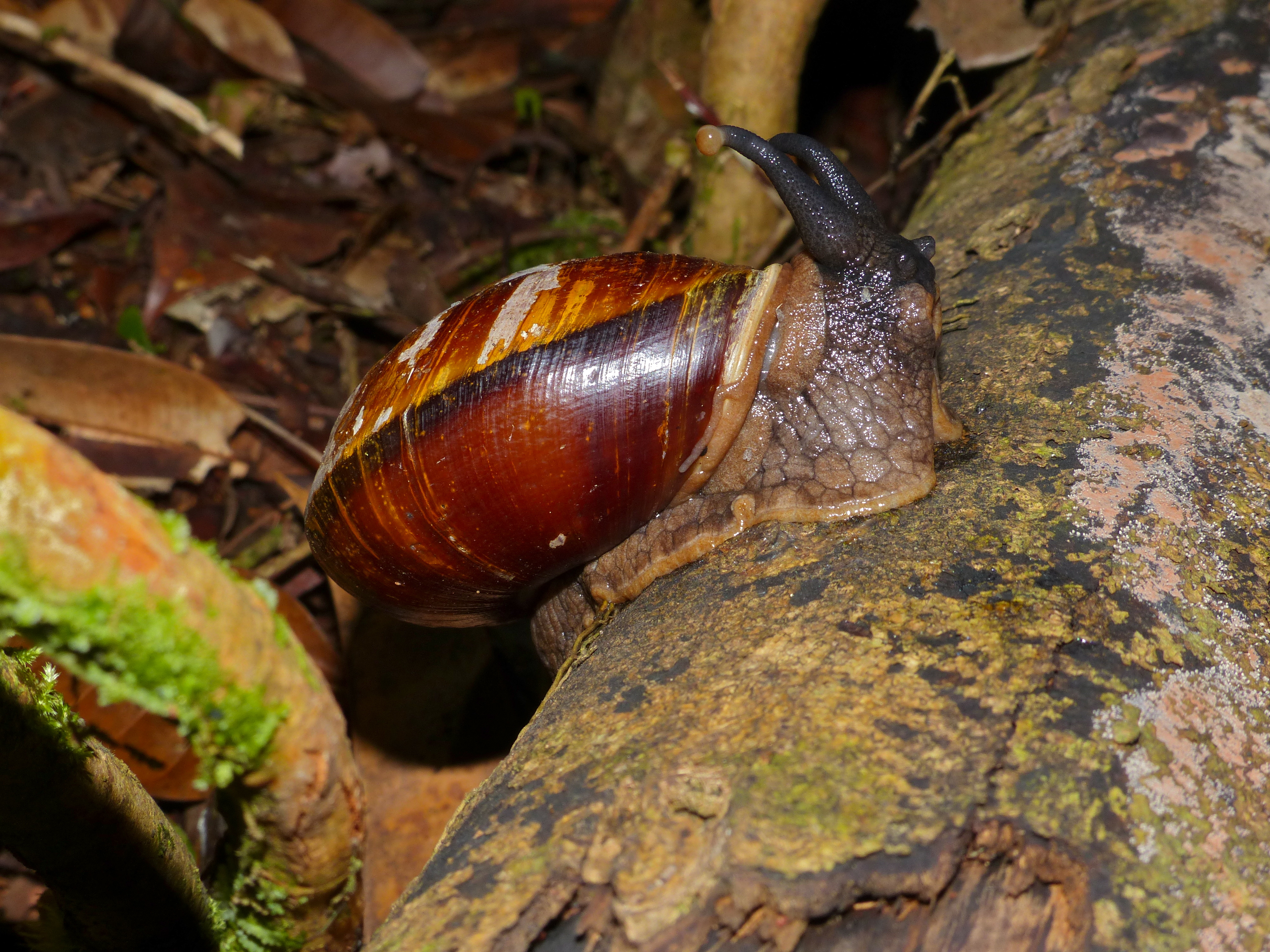
Bertia sp. in Mulu National Park, Sarawak

Bertia spp. have been recorded from the tropical forests of Borneo and Indo-China: all with very local distributions. The species listed below also all appear to be endangered, primarily due to habitat loss but exacerbated by over-collecting.

== Species ==
The World Register of Marine Species lists:

- Bertia cambojiensis (Reeve, 1860)
- Bertia pergrandis (E.A. Smith, 1893)
- Bertia setzeri Thach, 2015

Note: Bertia brookei (Adams & Reeve, 1848) is a synonym of Exrhysota brookei (Adams & Reeve, 1848) (Chronidae).
