= Kalamantania =

Scientific classification
- Kingdom: Animalia
- Phylum: Mollusca
- Class: Gastropoda
- Order: Stylommatophora
- Family: Dyakiidae
- Genus: Kalamantania; Laidlaw, 1931
- Species: K. whiteheadi

Binomial name
- Kalamantania whiteheadi (Godwin-Austen, 1891)

Synonyms
- Helicarion (?) whiteheadi Godwin-Austen, 1891

Species of gastropod

Kalamantania whiteheadi is a species of air-breathing land snail, a terrestrial pulmonate gastropod mollusc in the family Dyakiidae.

Kalamantania whiteheadi is the only species in the genus Kalamantania.

== Description ==
This species was originally discovered and described as Helicarion (?) whiteheadi by Henry Haversham Godwin-Austen in 1891.

Godwin-Austen's original text (the type description) reads as follows:

Helicarion (?) whiteheadi, n. sp. (Plate v. fig. 1.)

Shell depressedly globose, tumid, slight subangulation on periphery, not perforate; sculpture coarse, a peculiarly wrinkled surface, the lines having a very oblique transverse direction; colour rich umberbrown, pale purple and iridescent within the aperture; spire low, rounded on apex; suture impressed; whorls 3, rapidly increasing, the last much expanded; aperture widely ovate, oblique; peristome thin, not reflected at all on columellar margin, which is subvertical.

Size: maj. diam. 35.0, min. 28.0; alt. axis 12.0; breadth of aperture 20.0 millim.

Hab, Kina Balu Mountain, altitude not known (Mr. J. Whitehead).

== Distribution ==
The type locality is Mount Kinabalu in Borneo.
