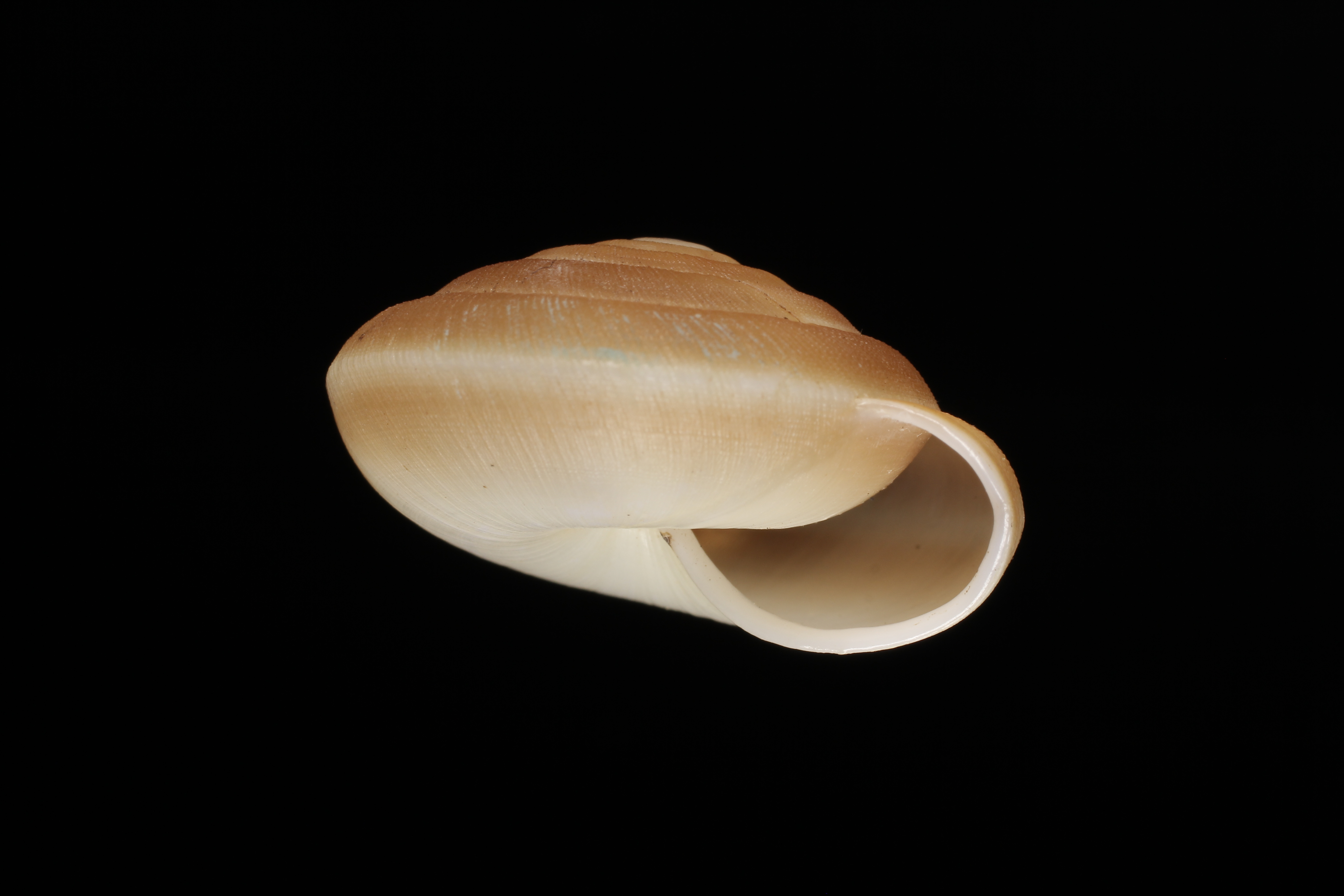
- Shell of Quantula franzhuberi (holotype at MNHN, Paris)

Scientific classification
- Kingdom: Animalia
- Phylum: Mollusca
- Class: Gastropoda
- Order: Stylommatophora
- Infraorder: Limacoidei
- Superfamily: Trochomorphoidea
- Family: Dyakiidae
- Genus: Quantula; H. B. Baker, 1941

Species
- See text

Synonyms
- Dyakia (Quantula) H. B. Baker, 1941

= Quantula =

Genus of snails

Quantula is a genus air-breathing, tropical land snails. It is a terrestrial, pulmonate, gastropod mollusc in the family Dyakiidae.

== Species ==
The World Register of Marine Species lists:

- Quantula franzhuberi Thach, 2020
- Quantula godwinausteni (Laidlaw, 1931)
- Quantula naggsi Thach & F. Huber, 2020
- Quantula simonei Thach & F. Huber, 2018
- Quantula striata (Gray, 1834)
- Quantula tenera (Möllendorff, 1901)
- Quantula weinkauffiana (Crosse & P. Fischer, 1863)
