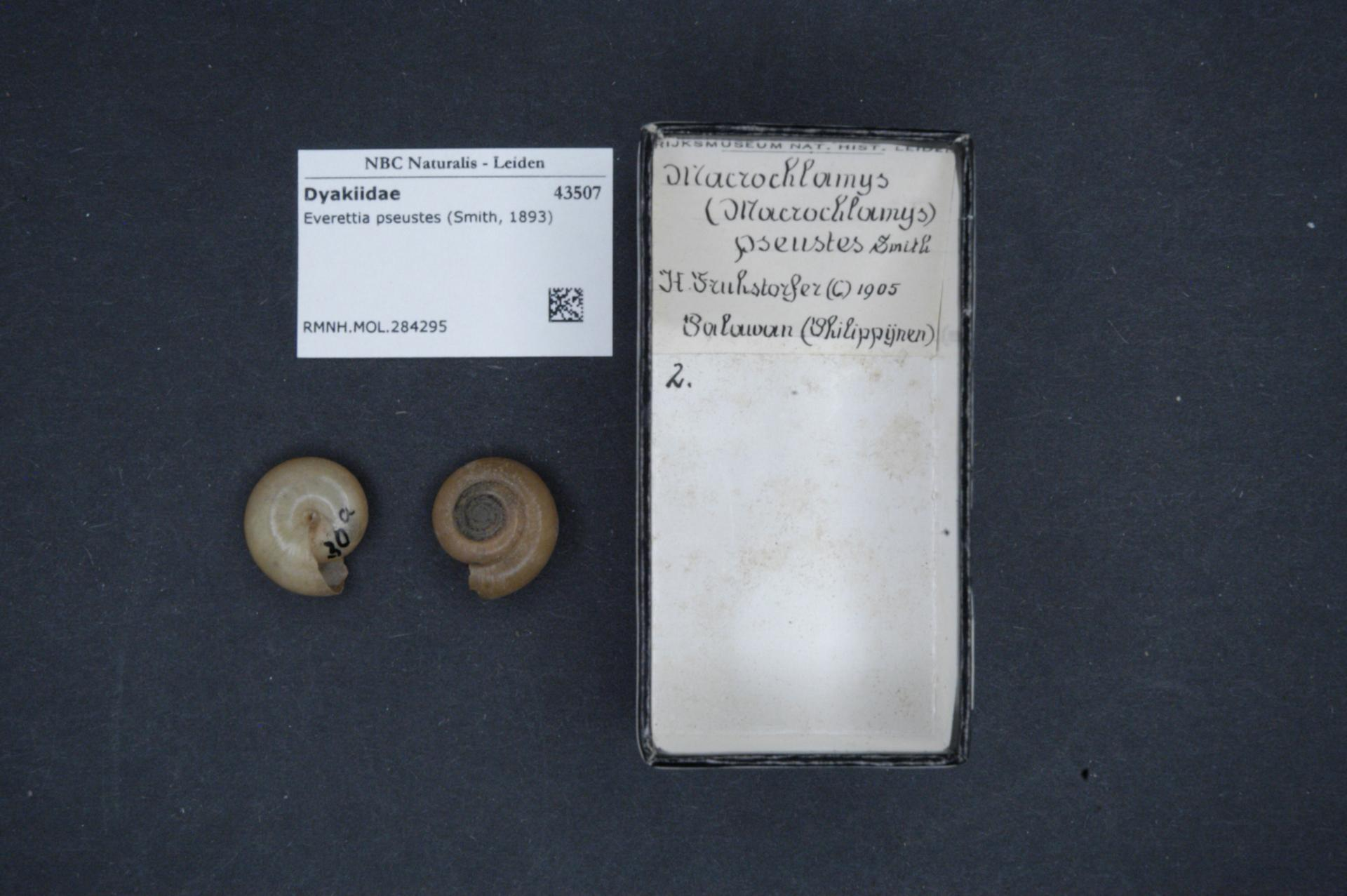
- Everettia

Scientific classification
- Kingdom: Animalia
- Phylum: Mollusca
- Class: Gastropoda
- Order: Stylommatophora
- Family: Dyakiidae
- Genus: Everettia; Godwin-Austen, 1891

= Everettia =

Genus of gastropods

Everettia is a genus of air-breathing land snails, terrestrial pulmonate gastropod mollusks in the family Dyakiidae.

The species within this genus are very difficult to identify from shells only, because the shells are all very similar.

== Species ==
The genus Everettia included 15 species in 2007 but there was described additional 11 species of Everettia in northern Borneo in 2009:

- Everettia corrugata Laidlaw, 1937
  - Everettia corrugata corrugata Laidlaw, 1937
  - Everettia corrugata williamsi Liew, Schilthuizen & Vermeulen, 2009
- Everettia dominiki Liew, Schilthuizen & Vermeulen, 2009
- Everettia interior Liew, Schilthuizen & Vermeulen, 2009
- Everettia jasilini Liew, Schilthuizen & Vermeulen, 2009
- Everettia jucunda (L. Pfeiffer, 1891) - the type species
- Everettia jucundior Liew, Schilthuizen & Vermeulen, 2009
- Everettia klemmantanica Gude, 1918
- Everettia lapidini Liew, Schilthuizen & Vermeulen, 2009
- Everettia layanglayang Liew, Schilthuizen & Vermeulen, 2009
- Everettia monticola Liew, Schilthuizen & Vermeulen, 2009
- Everettia occidentalis Liew, Schilthuizen & Vermeulen, 2009
- Everettia paulbasintali Liew, Schilthuizen & Vermeulen, 2009
- Everettia planispira Liew, Schilthuizen & Vermeulen, 2009
- Everettia safriei Liew, Schilthuizen & Vermeulen, 2009
- Everettia subconsul (Smith, 1887)
- Everettia themis (Smith, 1895)
