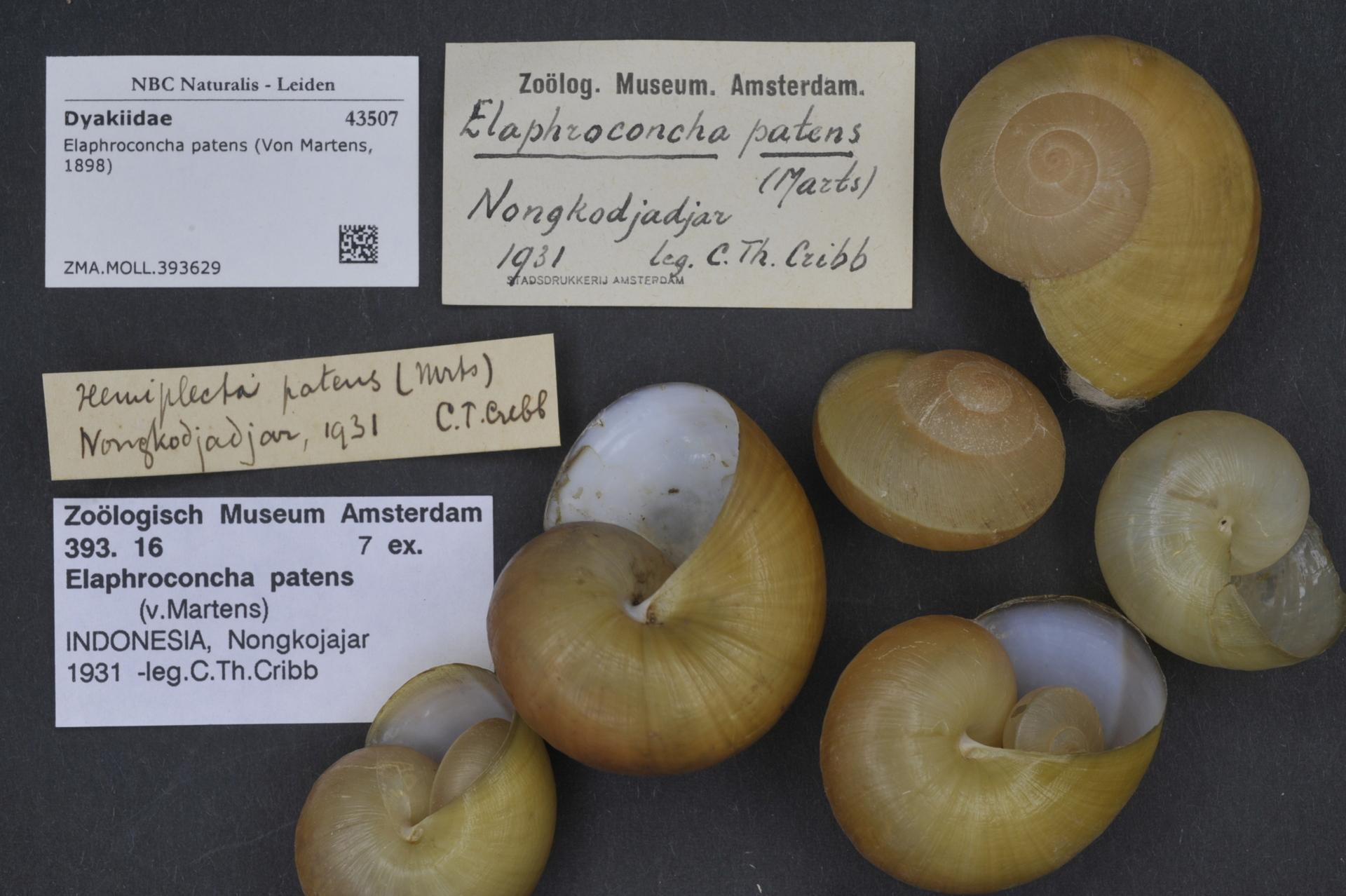
- Naturalis Biodiversity Center - ZMA.MOLL.393629 - Elaphroconcha patens (Von Martens, 1898) - Dyakiidae - Mollusc shell

Scientific classification
- Kingdom: Animalia
- Phylum: Mollusca
- Class: Gastropoda
- Order: Stylommatophora
- Family: Dyakiidae
- Genus: Elaphroconcha; Gude, 1911

= Elaphroconcha =

Genus of gastropods

Elaphroconcha is a genus of air-breathing land snails, terrestrial pulmonate gastropod mollusks in the family Dyakiidae.

The generic name Elaphroconcha consist of Ancient Greek word ἐλαφρός (elaphrós) that means "light" and of Ancient Greek word κόγχη (konche) that means "shell" (conch).

== Species ==
The genus Elaphroconcha includes 10 species:

- Elaphroconcha internota (E. Smith, 1898) - the type species
- Elaphroconcha javacensis Férrusac, 1821 - photo
- Elaphroconcha patens E. von Martens, 1898

== Description ==
Gerard Pierre Laurent Kalshoven Gude described the genus like this:

Shell depressed, thin, fragile, translucent corneous, amber-coloured, dull above, polished below, finely striated, last whorl dilated towards aperture, more than twice the size of the penultimate whorl, impervious.
