= Sasakina =

Scientific classification
- Kingdom: Animalia
- Phylum: Mollusca
- Class: Gastropoda
- Order: Stylommatophora
- Family: Dyakiidae
- Genus: Sasakina; Rensch, 1930

Genus of gastropods

Sasakina is a genus of air-breathing land snails, terrestrial pulmonate gastropod mollusks in the family Dyakiidae.

== Species ==
The genus Sasakina includes:

1. Sasakina bicincta B. Rensch, 1933
2. Sasakina oxyconus (E. von Martens, 1896)- type species
3. Sasakina perinsignis (E. A. Smith, 1898)
4. Sasakina plesseni B. Rensch, 1938
5. Sasakina vitrinolactea (B. Rensch, 1930)
