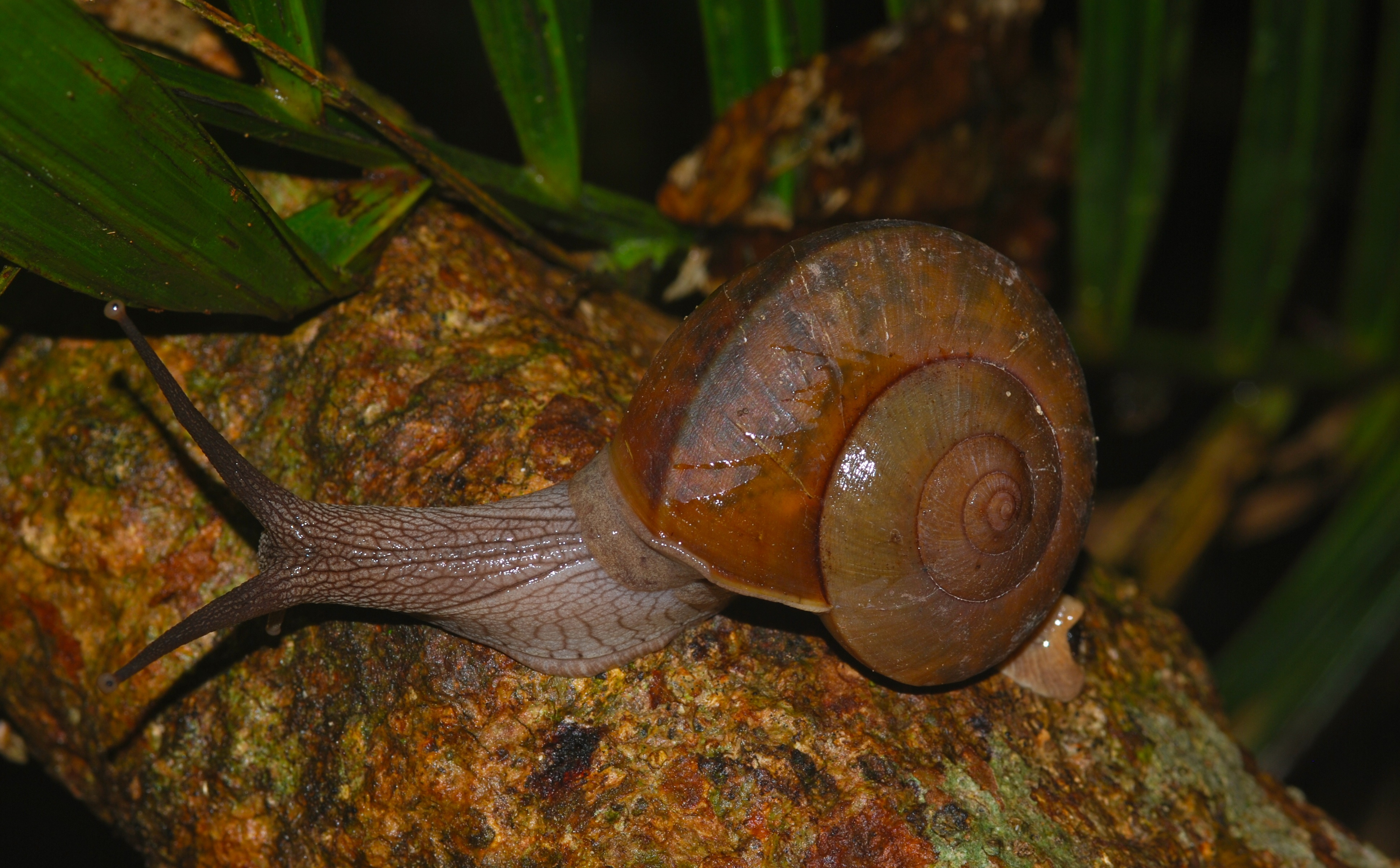
- Dyakia janus in Malaysia

Scientific classification
- Domain: Eukaryota
- Kingdom: Animalia
- Phylum: Mollusca
- Class: Gastropoda
- Order: Stylommatophora
- Family: Dyakiidae
- Genus: Dyakia; Godwin-Austen, 1891

Diversity
- 22 species

= Dyakia (gastropod) =

Genus of gastropods

Dyakia is a genus of air-breathing land snails, terrestrial pulmonate gastropod mollusks in the family Dyakiidae.

Dyakia is the type genus of the family Dyakiidae.

== Species ==
The genus Dyakia include 22 species:

- Dyakia chlorosoma Vermeulen, Liew & Schilthuizen, 2015
- Dyakia clypeus (Mousson, 1857)
- Dyakia densestriata Schepman, 1896
- Dyakia euconus Sykes, 1905
- Dyakia granaria (Bock, 1881)
- Dyakia janus (Beck, 1837)
- Dyakia kintana (De Morgan, 1885)
- Dyakia mackensiana (Souleyet, 1841)
- Dyakia moluensis Godwin-Austen, 1891
- Dyakia hugonis (L. Pfeiffer, 1863) - the type species
- Dyakia perstriata Sykes, 1905
- Dyakia? retrorsa
- Dyakia rumphii (Von Den Busch, 1842)
- Dyakia salangana (Martens, 1883)
- Dyakia sannio (Pfeiffer, 1854)

Synonyms:

- Dyakia striata is a synonym for Quantula striata, the only known terrestrial gastropod to emit light
