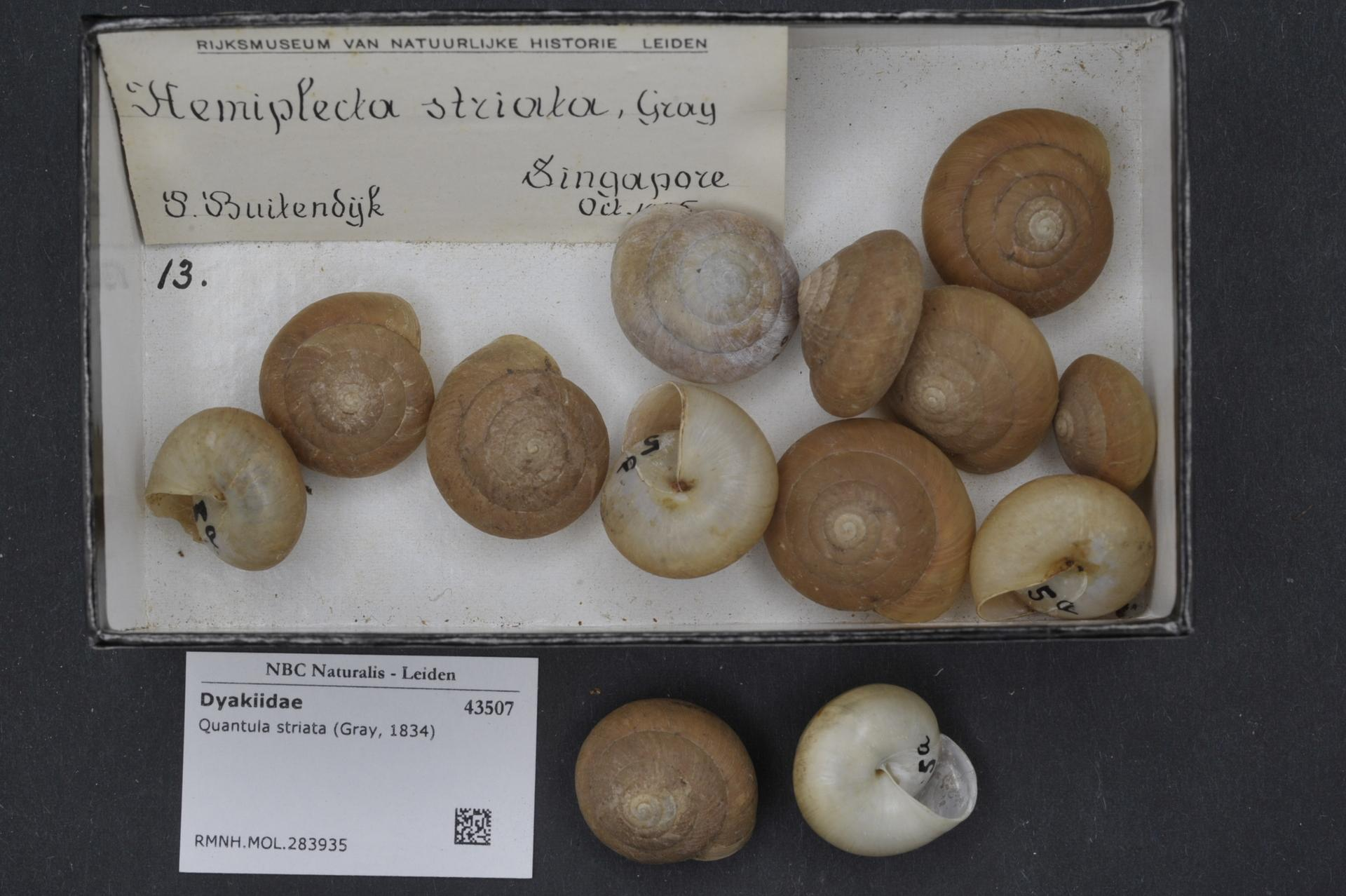

Scientific classification
- Kingdom: Animalia
- Phylum: Mollusca
- Class: Gastropoda
- Order: Stylommatophora
- Family: Dyakiidae
- Genus: Quantula
- Species: Q. striata

Binomial name
- Quantula striata (Gray, 1834)

Synonyms
- Nanina striata Gray, 1834 (basionym); Ariophanta striata (J. E. Gray, 1834); Helix naninoides Benson, 1842; Hemiplecta leechi de Morgan, 1885

= Quantula striata =

Species of gastropod

Quantula striata, also known as Dyakia striata, is a species of medium-sized, air-breathing, tropical land snail. It is a terrestrial, pulmonate, gastropod mollusc in the family Dyakiidae. This species appears to be unique among terrestrial gastropods in that it is bioluminescent: Its eggs glow in the dark, and juveniles and most adults give off flashes of green light.

== Distribution ==
This species occurs in Singapore, Malaysia, Cambodia, the Philippines, Fiji, and some islands in the Rhio Archipelago.

== Shell description ==
The shell of this species is dextral (right-handed) in coiling. The shell of an adult snail is 16–27 mm in width. The umbilicus is narrow. The color of the shell is brown, shading to white underneath.

== Anatomy ==
The length of the body is up to 5–6 cm. The dorsal part of the head and foot is dark brown in color. The ventral parts are creamy white in color. The eye tentacles are long, and the eye spots are large.

== Bioluminescence ==
Quantula striata is the only terrestrial gastropod known to exhibit bioluminescence. This was not discovered until 1942, when it was reported by Dr. Yata Haneda (see also Haneda 1946), probably because the flashes are quite dim. The purpose of the snail's bioluminescence is not yet fully understood, but it is thought to have some relation to animal communication. Light is emitted by an organ known as the "organ of Haneda," located in the head-foot region of the adult snail. This organ consists of a 0.5 mm-wide cluster of giant cells and is a part of the suprapedal gland. The snail flashes while it is moving, and half as intensely when it is feeding, and does not flash when it is inactive. Flashes lasts 0.5–6.0 s.

The light produced is yellow-green, with a wavelength of about 515 nm. The substance which produces it has not yet been identified. Isobe at al. (1991) stated that the fluorescent substance "may be similar to flavin".

The eggs of this species glow, and so do newly hatched snails. Juveniles can produce flashes of light, as can most, but not all, adults.

== Ecology ==
In Singapore these snails live in a variety of disturbed habitats, such as lawns, walkways and rubbish dumps, and like most land snails, they are observed more often after rain.

These snails feed on vegetation, fruit and vegetables, and also on the decaying flesh of already dead animals.

In captivity the snails can feed on cucumber, lettuce, carrots, apple, and boiled eggs. The snails can eat chalk for calcium, and commercially available rat food for protein.

== See also ==
- Latia neritoides, a freshwater snail from New Zealand, is the only other pulmonate gastropod that shows bioluminescence.
