= Phuphania =

Scientific classification
- Kingdom: Animalia
- Phylum: Mollusca
- Class: Gastropoda
- Order: Stylommatophora
- Family: Dyakiidae
- Genus: Phuphania; C. Tumpeesuwan, Naggs & Panha, 2007

Species
- Phuphania cartinata C. Kongim, Bangon & Panha, Somsak, 2013; Phuphania costata C. Tumpeesuwan & S. Tumpeesuwan, 2014; Phuphania crossei (L. Pfeiffer, 1862); Phuphania globosa C. Tumpeesuwan, Naggs & Panha, 2007

Genus of snails

Phuphania is a genus air-breathing, tropical land snails. It is a terrestrial, pulmonate, gastropod mollusc in the family Dyakiidae. All members of this genus display bioluminescence.

== Species ==
The World Register of Marine Species lists:

- Phuphania cartinata C. Kongim, Bangon & Panha, Somsak, 2013
- Phuphania costata C. Tumpeesuwan & S. Tumpeesuwan, 2014
- Phuphania crossei (L. Pfeiffer, 1862)
- Phuphania globosa C. Tumpeesuwan, Naggs & Panha, 2007 - type species.
