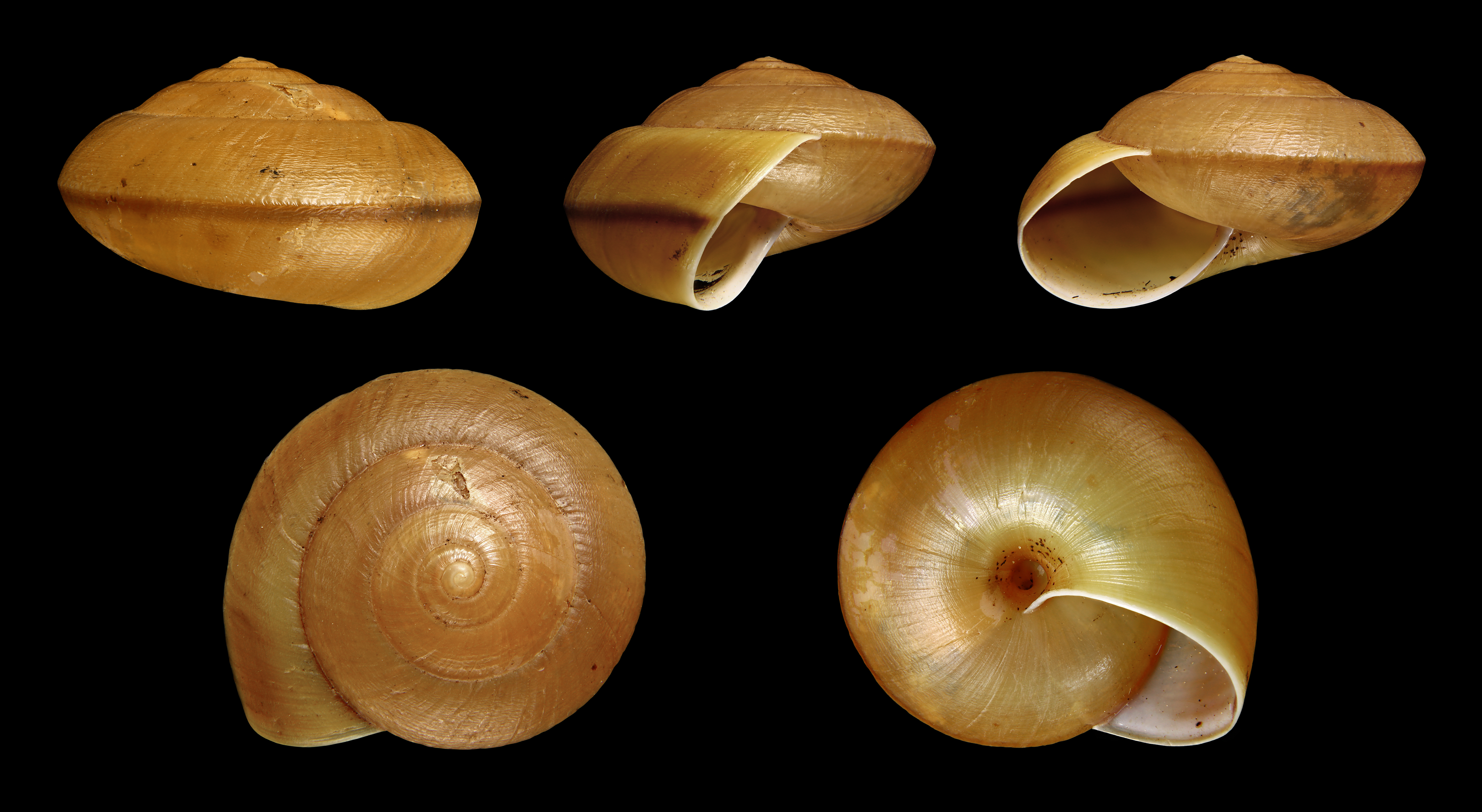
- Five views of a shell of Dyakia salangana

Scientific classification
- Kingdom: Animalia
- Phylum: Mollusca
- Class: Gastropoda
- Order: Stylommatophora
- Suborder: Helicina
- Infraorder: Limacoidei
- Superfamily: Trochomorphoidea
- Family: Dyakiidae; Gude & B. B. Woodward, 1921

= Dyakiidae =

Family of gastropods

Dyakiidae is a family of air-breathing land snails terrestrial pulmonate gastropod mollusks in the superfamily Trochomorphoidea (according to the taxonomy of the Gastropoda by Bouchet & Rocroi, 2005).

Some of the species in this family are sinistral (left-handed) in their shell coiling.

== Distribution ==
The family Dyakiidae is endemic to Sundaland in Southeast Asia.

== Anatomy ==
In this family, the number of haploid chromosomes is between 26 and 30 (according to the values in this table).

The family also includes the only known terrestrial gastropods to emit light.

The Digestive system characteristics are as follows. The buccal mass is small. The jaw is smooth. The stomach is very simple with weak muscles (as is the case in the majority of land snails). (These anatomical characteristics also include the family Staffordiidae which was considered part of the Dyakiidae at the time the study was done).

== Genera ==
The family Dyakiidae includes the following genera, with a steadily increasing number of described species (71 species until 2007 + 11 new species in 2009):

1. Asperitas Gray, 1857 - 14 species
2. Bertia Ancey, 1887 - at least 4 species
3. Dyakia Godwin-Austen, 1891 - type genus, 22 species
4. Elaphroconcha Gude, 1911 - 10 species
5. Everettia Godwin-Austen, 1891 - 25 species
6. Kalamantania Laidlaw, 1931 - only one species: Kalamantania whiteheadi (Godwin-Austen, 1891)
7. Phuphania Tumpeesuwan, Naggs & Panha, 2007 - 3 species including: Phuphania globosa Tumpeesuwan, Naggs & Panha, 2007
8. Pseudoplecta Laidlaw, 1932 - only one species: Pseudoplecta bijuga (Stoliczka, 1873)
9. Pseudoquantula Jirapatrasilp & Panha gen. nov. - only one species: Pseudoquantula lenticularis Jirapatrasilp & Panha sp. nov.
10. Quantula Baker, 1941 - 7 species including: Quantula striata (Gray, 1834)
11. Rhinocochlis Thiele, 1931 - only one species: Rhinocochlis nasuta (Metcalfe, 1852)
12. Sasakina Rensch, 1930 - 5 species

== Cladogram ==
The following cladogram shows the phylogenic relationships of this family and superfamily with the other families within the limacoid clade:

- limacoid clade
  - Staffordioidea
    Staffordiidae
  - - - Dyakioidea
        Dyakiidae
      - Gastrodontoidea
        - Pristilomatidae
        - - Chronidae
          - - Euconulidae
            - Trochomorphidae
          - - Gastrodontidae
            - Oxychilidae
    - - Parmacelloidea
        - Trigonochlamydidae
        - Parmacellidae
        - Milacidae
      - - - Zonitoidea
            Zonitidae
          - Helicarionoidea
            - Helicarionidae
            - - Ariophantidae
              - Urocyclidae
        - Limacoidea
          - Vitrinidae
          - - Boettgerillidae
            - - Limacidae
              - Agriolimacidae
