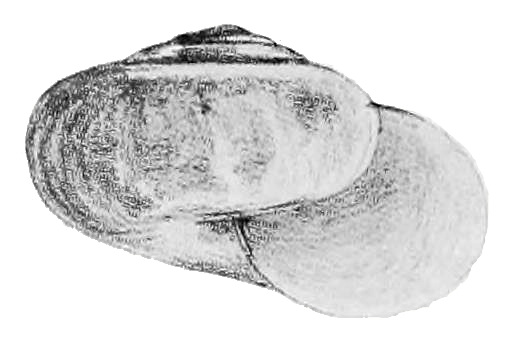

Scientific classification
- Kingdom: Animalia
- Phylum: Mollusca
- Class: Gastropoda
- Order: Stylommatophora
- Suborder: Helicina
- Infraorder: Limacoidei
- Superfamily: Trochomorphoidea; Möllendorff, 1890

Families
- See text

Synonyms
- Dyakioidea Gude & B. B. Woodward, 1921

= Trochomorphoidea =

Superfamily of gastropods

Trochomorphoidea is a taxonomic superfamily of small to large terrestrial pulmonate gastropod mollusks, that belong to the infraorder Limacoidei.

== Families ==
- Chronidae Thiele, 1931
- Dyakiidae Gude & B. B. Woodward, 1921
- Euconulidae H. B. Baker, 1928
- Geotrochidae Schileyko, 2002
- Microcystidae Thiele, 1931
- Staffordiidae Thiele, 1931
- Trochomorphidae Möllendorff, 1890

Synonyms

- Ryssotidae Schileyko, 2003: synonym of Chronidae Thiele, 1931
