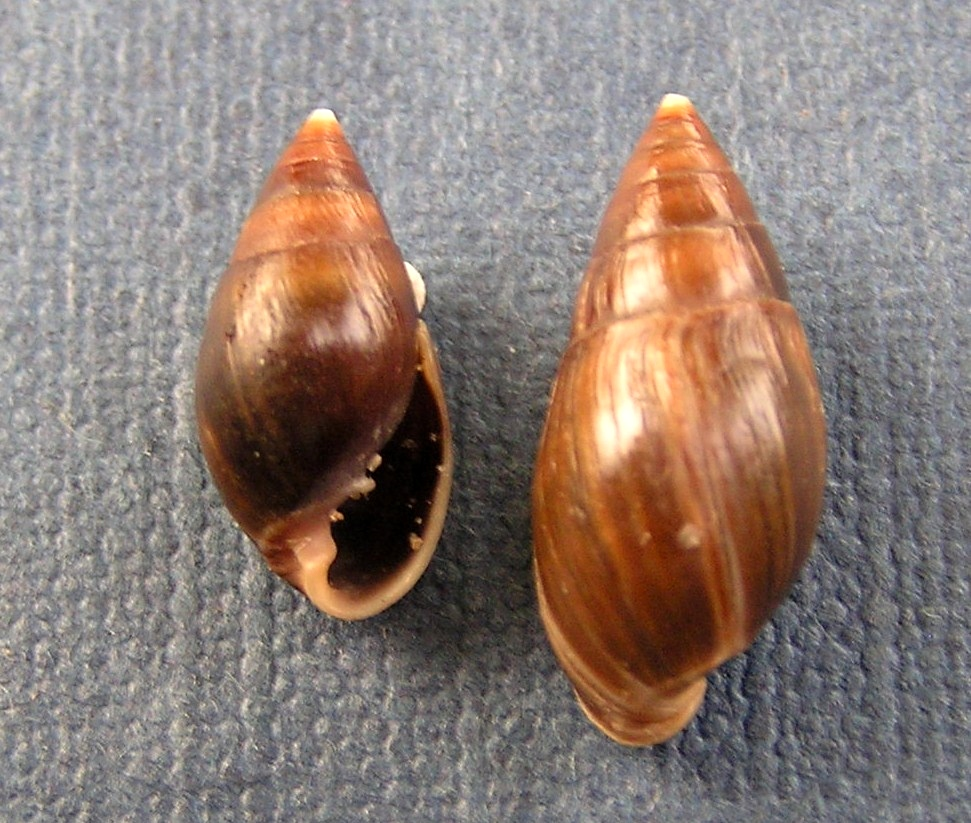
- Two shells of Ophicardelus ornatus

Scientific classification
- Kingdom: Animalia
- Phylum: Mollusca
- Class: Gastropoda
- Order: Ellobiida
- Family: Ellobiidae
- Subfamily: Carychiinae
- Genus: Ophicardelus; Beck, 1838

= Ophicardelus =

Genus of gastropods

Ophicardelus is a genus of small, air-breathing land snails or salt marsh snails, terrestrial pulmonate gastropod molluscs in the family Ellobiidae.

== Species ==
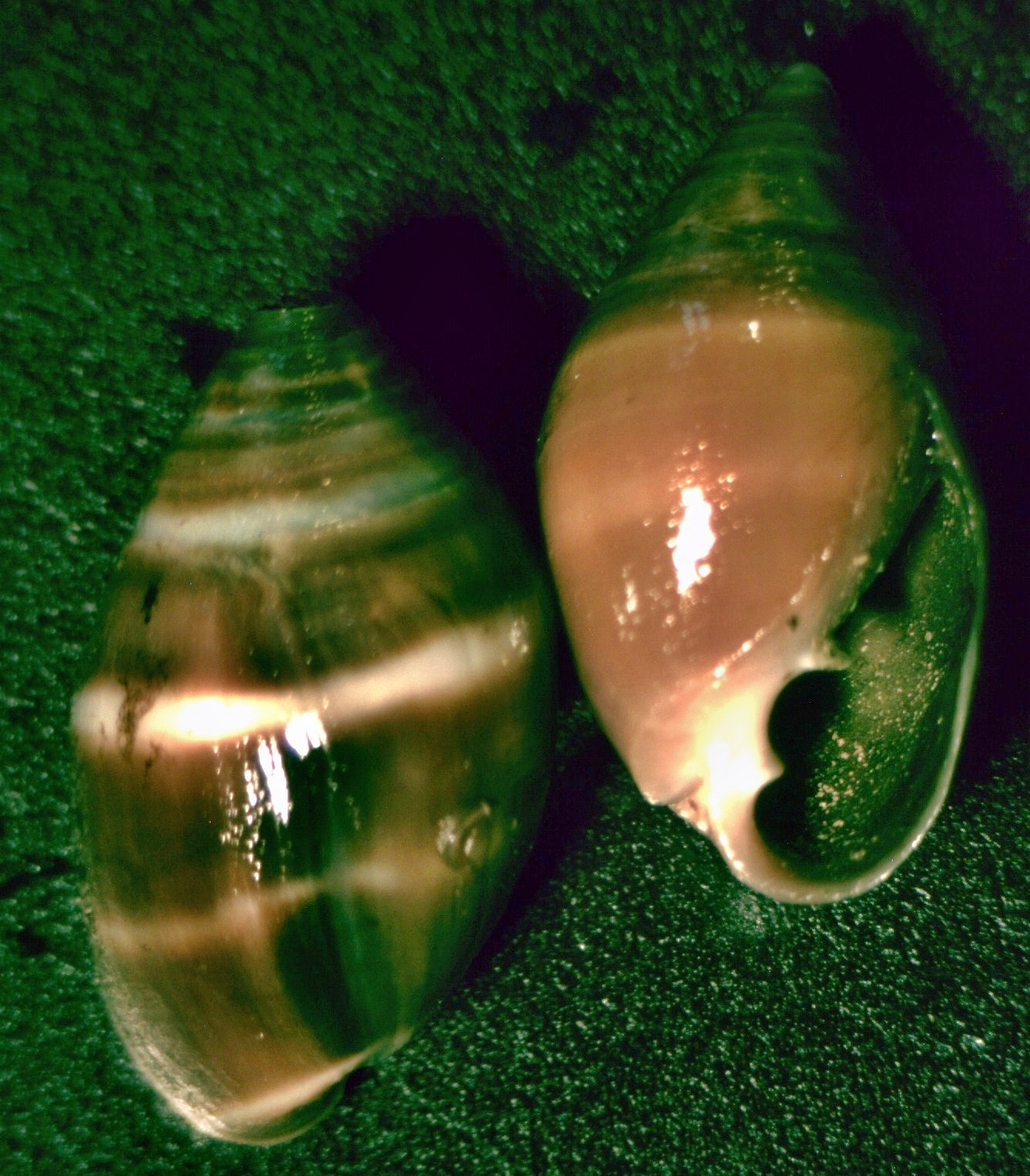
Ophicardelus sulcatus

Species within the genus Ophicardelus include:

- Ophicardelus costellaris H. Adams & A. Adams, 1854 - New Zealand, Australia, synonym: Ophicardelus australis H. H. Beck, 1838
- Ophicardelus ornatus (Férussac, 1821) - synonym: Ophicardelus ornata A. de Férussac, 1821 - Australia, (drawing)
- Ophicardelus quoyi H. Adams & A. Adams, 1855 - synonyms: Ophicardelus irregularis Mousson, 1869; Ophicardelus minor Mousson, 1869 - Australia
- Ophicardelus sulcatus H. Adams & A. Adams, 1855 - Australia

Synonyms:

- Ophicardelus layardi H. Adams & A. Adams, 1855 is a synonym of Allochroa layardi (H. Adams & A. Adams, 1855)
