= Auriculinella =

Scientific classification
- Kingdom: Animalia
- Phylum: Mollusca
- Class: Gastropoda
- Order: Ellobiida
- Family: Ellobiidae
- Genus: †Auriculinella; Winckworth, 1949

Synonyms
- Alexia (Leuconia) Gray, 1840

Genus of gastropods

Auriculinella is an extinct genus of small air-breathing land snails, terrestrial pulmonate gastropod mollusks in the family Ellobiidae.

This is a monotypic genus.

== Species ==
The only species within the genus Leucophytia is:

- † Auriculinella whitei Tausch, 1886

Synonyms

- subgenus Auriculinella (Leucophytia) Winckworth, 1949: synonym of Leucophytia Winckworth, 1949
- Auriculinella bidentata (Montagu, 1808): synonym of Leucophytia bidentata (Montagu, 1808) (superseded combination)
- Auriculinella erosa (Jeffreys, 1830): synonym of Leucophytia bidentata (Montagu, 1808) (junior subjective synonym)
