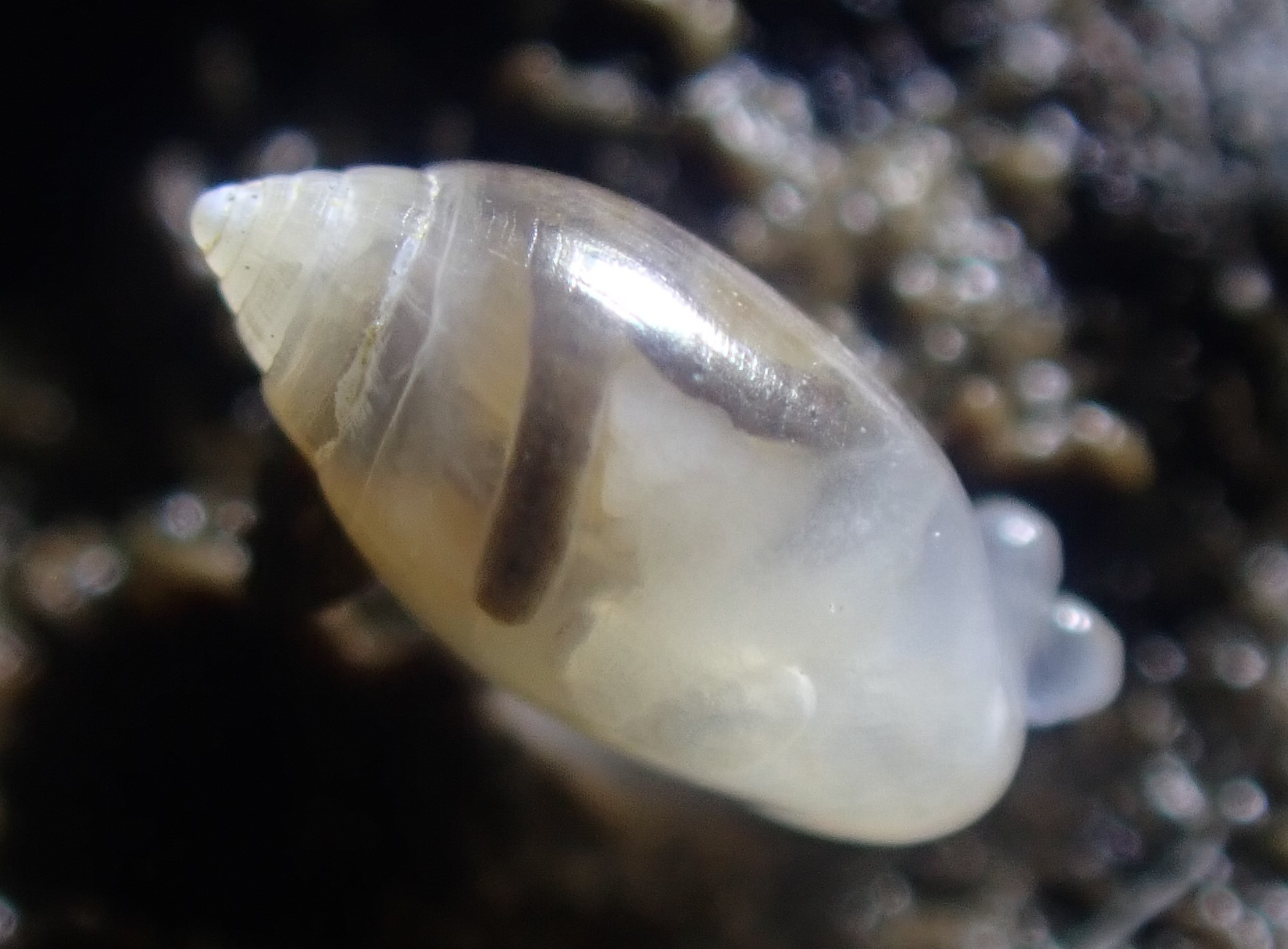
- Microtralia insularis found in Onehunga, Auckland, New Zealand

Scientific classification
- Kingdom: Animalia
- Phylum: Mollusca
- Class: Gastropoda
- Order: Ellobiida
- Family: Ellobiidae
- Genus: Microtralia
- Species: M. insularis

Binomial name
- Microtralia insularis (Powell, 1933)

= Microtralia insularis =

Species of gastropod

Microtralia insularis is a species of small air-breathing land snail, a marine pulmonate gastropod mollusc in the family Ellobiidae.

In Powell, 1979, this species was referred to as Rangitotoa insularis. However, the genus Rangitotoa is now considered to be an invalid synonym of Microtralia, and Rangitotoa insularis an invalid synonym of Microtralia occidentalis. The latter name is considered by some sources to be an invalid synonym of Microtralia ovulum (sometimes spelled Microtralia ovula), while other sources treat all three nominal species, including Microtralia insularis, as valid. There does not appear to be any published reason to doubt Climo's (1982) synonymies.
