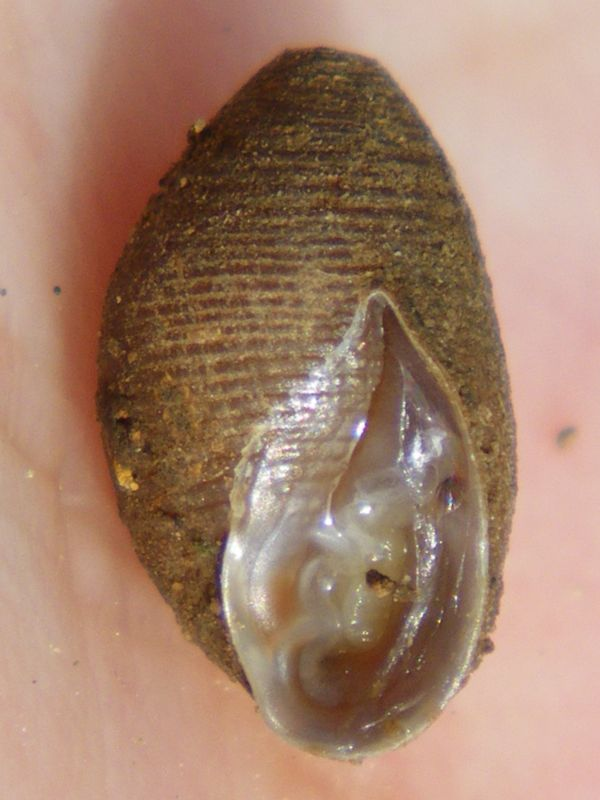
- Laemodonta siamensis, live animal withdrawn into its shell

Scientific classification
- Kingdom: Animalia
- Phylum: Mollusca
- Class: Gastropoda
- Order: Ellobiida
- Superfamily: Ellobioidea
- Family: Ellobiidae
- Genus: Laemodonta; Philippi, 1846

Type species
- Auricula striata Philippi, 1846

Synonyms
- Auricula (Plecotrema) H. Adams & A. Adams, 1854; Laemodonta (Laemodonta) Philippi, 1846· accepted, alternate representation; Laimodonta H. Adams & A. Adams, 1855 (unjustified emendation of original genus name Laemodonta Philippi, 1846); Ophicardelus (Laimodonta) H. Adams & A. Adams, 1855 (unjustified emendation of original genus name Laemodonta Philippi, 1846); Plecotrema H. Adams & A. Adams, 1854; † Plecotrema (Plecotremopsis) de Morgan, 1917 (junior synonym)

= Laemodonta =

Genus of gastropods

Laemodonta is a genus of small air-breathing, saltmarsh snails, terrestrial pulmonate gastropod mollusks in the family Ellobiidae.

== Description ==
(Description as Plecotrema) The solid shell has an ovate-conic shape and is umbilicated. The acute spire is elevated. The oblong aperture is contracted. The inner lip shows three plaits, the middle one bifid. The outer lip has a marginal varix and is internally bidentate.

== Species ==
Species within the genus Laemodonta include:

- Laemodonta bella (H. Adams & A. Adams, 1855)
- Laemodonta blaisei (Dautzenberg & H. Fischer, 1905)
- † Laemodonta blesensis (Tournouër, 1870) †
- † Laemodonta bourgeoisi (Tournouër, 1870) †
- Laemodonta clausa (H. Adams & A. Adams, 1854)
- Laemodonta cubensis (Pfeiffer, 1854)
- † Laemodonta delaunayi (Tournouër, 1870) †
- Laemodonta exaratoides Kawabe, 1992
- Laemodonta hirsuta (Garrett, 1872)
- Laemodonta livida Perugia, 2010
- Laemodonta madagascariensis Bozzetti, 2007
- Laemodonta minuta (Möllendorff, 1885)
- Laemodonta monilifera (H. Adams & A. Adams, 1854)
- Laemodonta oblonga Jickeli, 1874
- Laemodonta octanfracta (Jonas, 1845)
- Laemodonta punctatostriata (H. Adams & A. Adams, 1854)
- Laemodonta punctigera (H. Adams & A. Adams, 1853)
- Laemodonta rapax (Dohrn, 1860)
- Laemodonta siamensis (Morelet, 1875)
- † Laemodonta striata (Förster, 1888) †
- Laemodonta typica (H. & A. Adams, 1854)

Species brought into synonymy

- Laemodonta affinis (Férussac, 1821) : synonym of Pedipes affinis Férussac, 1821
- Laemodonta amplicatus C. F. Jickeli, 1874: synonym of Pedipes amplicatus (C. F. Jickeli, 1874)
- Laemodonta bronni (sic): synonym of Allochroa bronnii (Philippi, 1846)
- Laemodonta ciliata (Tate, 1879): synonym of Laemodonta octanfracta (Jonas, 1845)
- Laemodonta conica (Pease, 1863): synonym of Allochroa layardi (H. Adams & A. Adams, 1855)
- Laemodonta exarata (H. Adams & A. Adams, 1854) synonym of Melampus exaratus H. Adams & A. Adams, 1854
- Laemodonta exigua (H. Adams, 1867): synonym of Laemodonta bella (H. Adams & A. Adams, 1855)
- Laemodonta striata (Philippi, 1846): synonym of Laemodonta octanfracta (Jonas, 1845)
