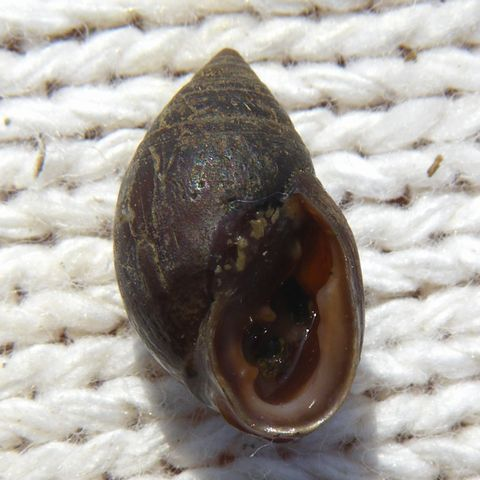
- Shell of Cassidula plecotrematoides japonica.

Scientific classification
- Kingdom: Animalia
- Phylum: Mollusca
- Class: Gastropoda
- Order: Ellobiida
- Family: Ellobiidae
- Genus: Cassidula
- Species: C. plecotrematoides

Binomial name
- Cassidula plecotrematoides Möllendorff, 1901

= Cassidula plecotrematoides =

Species of gastropod

Cassidula plecotrematoides is a species of small air-breathing salt marsh snail, a pulmonate gastropod mollusk in the family Ellobiidae.

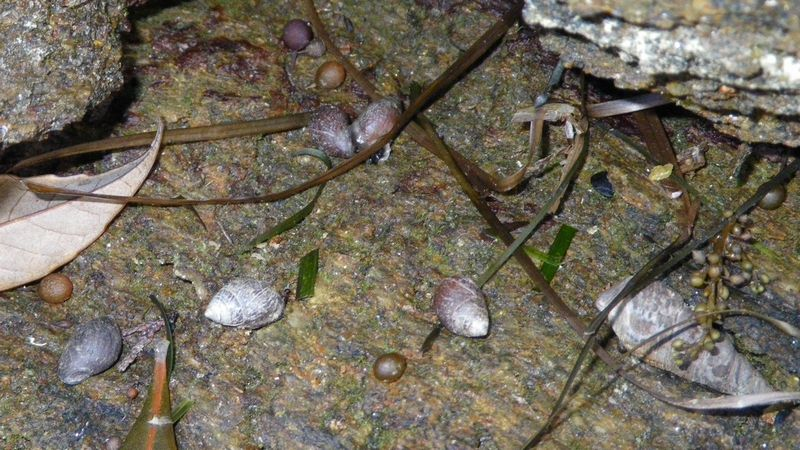
Cassidula plecotrematoides japonica in its natural environment.

== Subspecies ==
- Cassidula plecotrematoides japonica Möllendorff, 1901
- Cassidula plecotrematoides plecotrematoides Möllendorff, 1901

== Distribution ==
Cassidula plecotrematoides japonica occurs in Japan and it is critically endangered and endangered (CR+EN) there.

The conservation status of Cassidula plecotrematoides plecotrematoides is near threatened.
