= Allochroa tenuis =

Scientific classification
- Kingdom: Animalia
- Phylum: Mollusca
- Class: Gastropoda
- Order: Ellobiida
- Family: Ellobiidae
- Genus: Allochroa
- Species: A. tenuis

Binomial name
- Allochroa tenuis Frias Martins, 1995

Species of gastropod

Allochroa tenuis is a species of gastropods belonging to the family Ellobiidae.

== Description ==
The length of the shell attains 4.6 mm.

== Distribution ==
This marine species occurs off the Philippines and New Caledonia.
