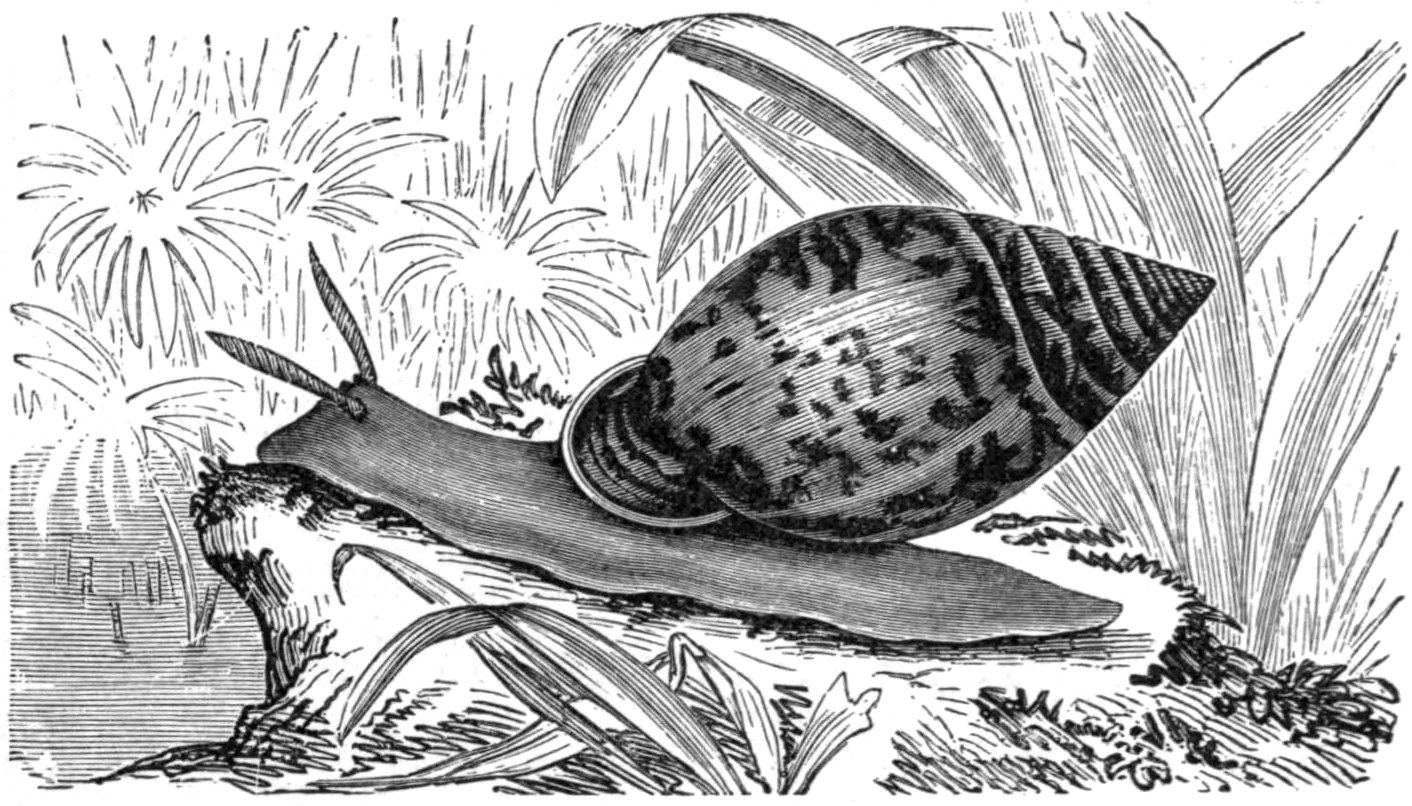
- Engraving of a live individual of Pythia scarabaeus.

Scientific classification
- Kingdom: Animalia
- Phylum: Mollusca
- Class: Gastropoda
- Order: Ellobiida
- Family: Ellobiidae
- Genus: Pythia
- Species: P. scarabaeus

Binomial name
- Pythia scarabaeus Linnaeus, 1758

Synonyms
- Helix scarabaeus Linnaeus, 1758 (original combination); Pythia argenvillei L. Pfeiffer, 1853; Pythia helicina Röding, 1798; Scarabus imbrium Montfort, 1810

= Pythia scarabaeus =

Species of gastropod

Pythia scarabaeus is a species of air-breathing saltmarsh snail, a pulmonate gastropod mollusc in the family Ellobiidae.

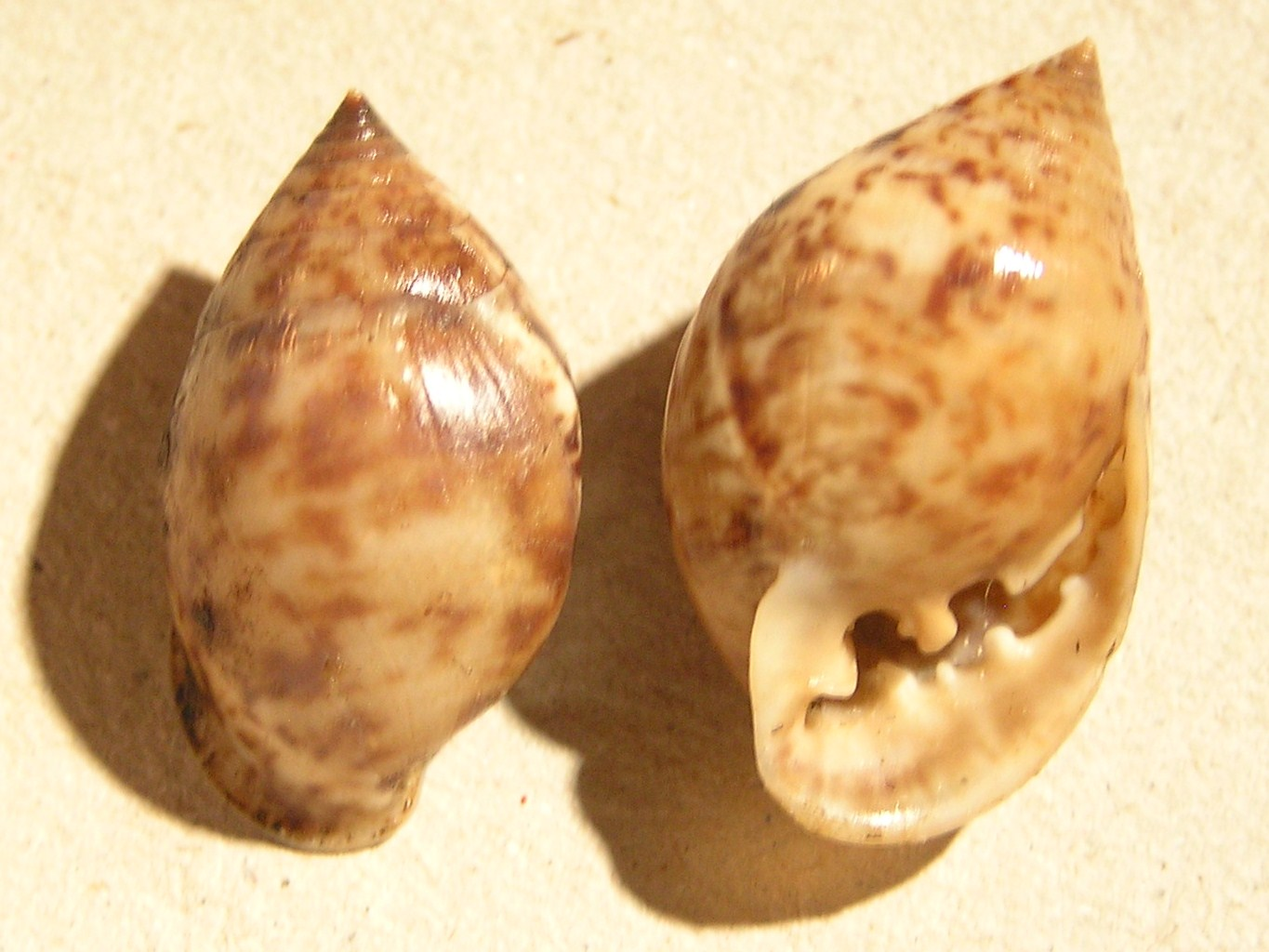
Two shells of Pythia scarabaeus

== Appearance ==
This salt marsh snail is light brown all over with dark brown to black spots distributed irregularly. variations include a lighter background color.

== Locality ==
Pythia scarabaeus is found in the Indo-Pacific range.
