= Allochroa succinea =

Scientific classification
- Kingdom: Animalia
- Phylum: Mollusca
- Class: Gastropoda
- Order: Ellobiida
- Family: Ellobiidae
- Genus: Allochroa
- Species: A. succinea

Binomial name
- Allochroa succinea Perugia, 2010

Species of gastropod

Allochroa succinea is a species of gastropods belonging to the family Ellobiidae.

== Description ==
The length of the shell attains 5.2 mm.

== Distribution ==
This marine species occurs off Madagascar.
