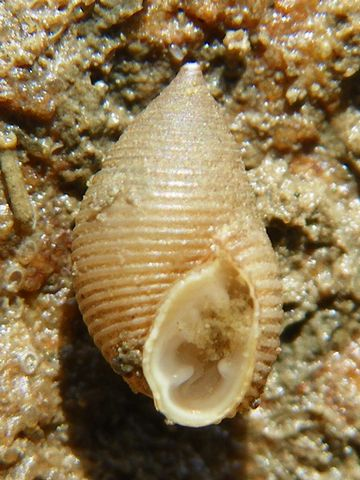
- Laemodonta monilifera, live animal withdrawn into shell

Scientific classification
- Kingdom: Animalia
- Phylum: Mollusca
- Class: Gastropoda
- Order: Ellobiida
- Family: Ellobiidae
- Genus: Laemodonta
- Species: L. monilifera

Binomial name
- Laemodonta monilifera H. Adams & A. Adams, 1854

= Laemodonta monilifera =

Species of gastropod

Laemodonta monilifera is a species of small air-breathing snail, a terrestrial pulmonate gastropod mollusc in the family Ellobiidae.

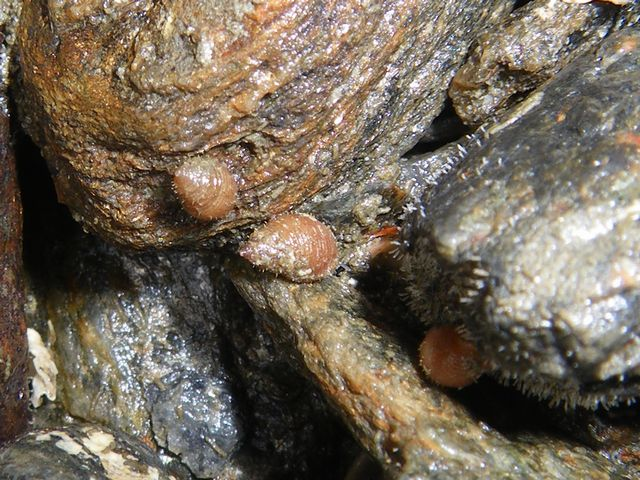
Two live individuals of Laemodonta monilifera

== Distribution ==
This species occurs in Japan.
