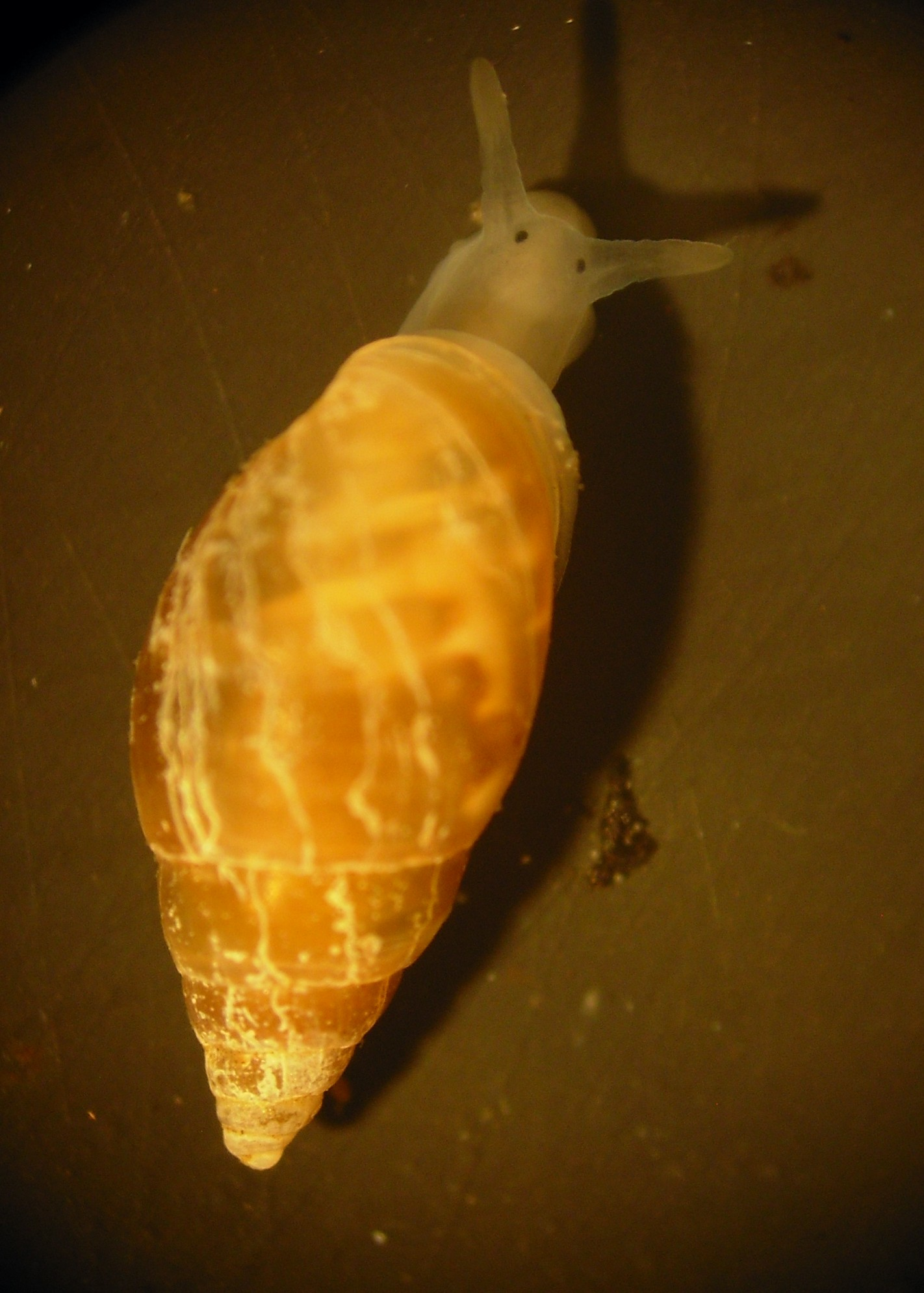
- live Myosotella myosotis

Scientific classification
- Kingdom: Animalia
- Phylum: Mollusca
- Class: Gastropoda
- Order: Ellobiida
- Superfamily: Ellobioidea
- Family: Ellobiidae
- Genus: Myosotella; Monterosato, 1906

Type species
- Auricula payraudeaui Shuttleworth, 1843

Synonyms
- Alexia Leach in Gray, 1847 (Invalid: junior homonym of Alexia Stephens, 1833 [Coleoptera]; Nealexia is a replacement name); Alexia (Kochia) Pallary, 1900; Auricula (Alexia) Leach in Gray, 1847; Kochia Pallary, 1900 (Invalid: junior homonym of Kochia Frech, 1891 [Bivalvia]); Nealexia Wenz, 1920; Ovatella (Alexia) Leach in Gray, 1847; Ovatella (Myosotella) Monterosato, 1906; Tralia (Alexia) Leach, 1847; Volatela Starobogatov, 1993

= Myosotella =

Genus of gastropods

Myosotella is a European genus or subgenus (of Ovatella) of small, salt marsh snails, terrestrial pulmonate gastropod mollusks in the subfamily Pythiinae of the family Ellobiidae.

It feeds on algae growing on the rocks in a stream.

== Species ==
Species within the genus Myosotella include:

- † Myosotella benoisti (Degrange-Touzin, 1892)
- Myosotella bicolor (Morelet, 1860)
- † Myosotella blesensis (de Morgan, 1917)
- † Myosotella boissyi (Cossmann, 1889)
- † Myosotella depressa (O. Boettger, 1877)
- † Myosotella dumortieri (Fontannes, 1876)
- † Myosotella elongata (Briart & Cornet, 1887)
- † Myosotella fusiformis (A. Bell, 1870)
- † Myosotella mucronata (O. Boettger, 1875)
- † Myosotella munieri (Tournouër, 1872)
- Myosotella myosotis Draparnaud, 1801
- † Myosotella myotis (Brocchi, 1814)
- † Myosotella obovata (Paladilhe, 1874)
- † Myosotella pisolina (Deshayes, 1830)
- † Myosotella raouli (Ivolas & Peyrot, 1900)
- † Myosotella torulosa (Paladilhe, 1874)
- † Myosotella viennensis (Fontannes, 1876)

Species brought into synonymy

- † Myosotella bardini (Tournouër, 1872): synonym of † Tralia bardini (Tournouër, 1872)
- Myosotella denticulata (Montagu, 1803): synonym of Myosotella myosotis (Draparnaud, 1801)
- † Myosotella polyodon (F. Sandberger, 1872): synonym of † Tralia bardini (Tournouër, 1872)
