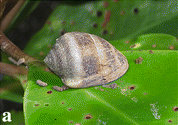
- A live Cassidula nucleus

Scientific classification
- Kingdom: Animalia
- Phylum: Mollusca
- Class: Gastropoda
- Order: Ellobiida
- Family: Ellobiidae
- Genus: Cassidula
- Species: C. nucleus

Binomial name
- Cassidula nucleus (Gmelin, 1791)

Synonyms
- Cassidula mustelina (Deshayes, 1830)

= Cassidula nucleus =

Species of gastropod

Cassidula nucleus is a species of air-breathing marine snail, a pulmonate gastropod mollusc in the family Ellobiidae.

== Distribution ==
Cassidula nucleus occurs in India, Vietnam, Malaysia, China.

== Description ==
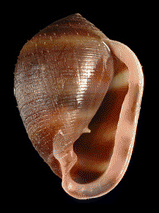
An apertural view of a shell of Cassidula nucleus.

The shell length of an adult snail is 16.0 mm.

== Ecology ==
Cassidula nucleus is a predominantly mangrove-associated species.
