= M. striata =

M. striata may refer to:

- Malacoptila striata, the Crescent-chested Puffbird, a bird species endemic to Brazil
- Marinula striata, a land snail species found in New Zealand
- Morula striata, sea snail species
- Mundulea striata, a plant species
- Muscicapa striata, the Spotted Flycatcher, a passerine bird species found in Europe and western Asia
- Myadora striata, a bivalve mollusc species
