= Allochroa nana =

Scientific classification
- Kingdom: Animalia
- Phylum: Mollusca
- Class: Gastropoda
- Order: Ellobiida
- Family: Ellobiidae
- Genus: Allochroa
- Species: A. nana

Binomial name
- Allochroa nana Frias Martins, 1995

Species of gastropod

Allochroa nana is a species of gastropods belonging to the family Ellobiidae.

== Description ==
The length of the shell attains 3.7 mm.

== Distribution ==
This marine species occurs off the Marshall Islands.
