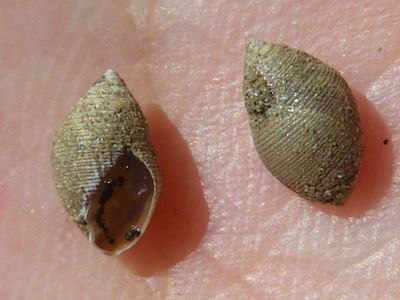
- Two live Laemodonta exaratoides withdrawn into shell

Scientific classification
- Kingdom: Animalia
- Phylum: Mollusca
- Class: Gastropoda
- Order: Ellobiida
- Family: Ellobiidae
- Genus: Laemodonta
- Species: L. exaratoides

Binomial name
- Laemodonta exaratoides Kuroda, 1957

= Laemodonta exaratoides =

Species of gastropod

Laemodonta exaratoides is a species of small air-breathing snail, a terrestrial pulmonate gastropod mollusc in the family Ellobiidae.

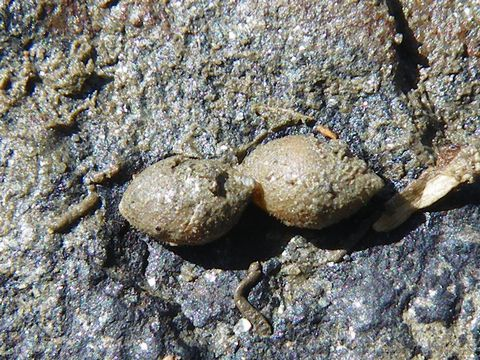
Two live individuals of Laemodonta exaratoides in situ

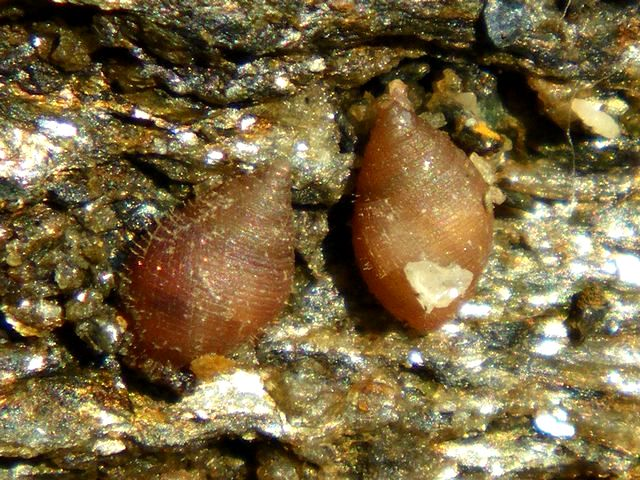
Two live individuals of Laemodonta exaratoides in situ

== Distribution ==
This species occurs in Japan (Honshū, Kyūshū and Shikoku) and it is Near Threatened species in Japan.
