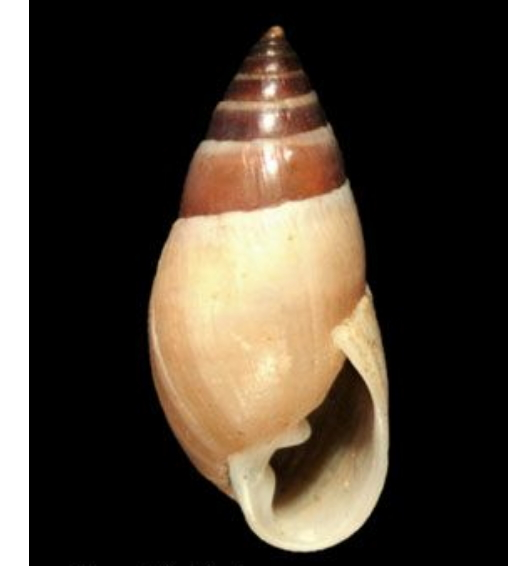
- Shell of Myosotella bicolor (specimen at the Natural History Museum, Rotterdam)

Scientific classification
- Domain: Eukaryota
- Kingdom: Animalia
- Phylum: Mollusca
- Class: Gastropoda
- Order: Ellobiida
- Family: Ellobiidae
- Genus: Myosotella
- Species: M. bicolor

Binomial name
- Myosotella bicolor (Morelet, 1860)

Synonyms
- Auricula bicolor Morelet, 1860

= Myosotella bicolor =

Species of gastropod

Myosotella myosotis, common name the mouse ear snail, is a European species of small salt marsh snail, a terrestrial pulmonate gastropod mollusc in the family Ellobiidae.

== Description ==
The length of the shell attains 11 mm (0.43 in), its diameter 4.7 mm (0.19 in).

(Original description in Latin) The fusiform-ovate shell is imperforate, with only occasional slits, and has a somewhat solid structure with fine striations. Its coloration is a grayish-tawny, with a pointed spire that is dark violet-brown. The shell comprises 8 slightly convex whorls, with the body whorl attenuated at the base and nearly equal in length to the spire. The suture is impressed and subtly margined. The aperture is narrowly semi-oval, slightly darkened within, and displays two folds. The parietal fold is compressed below the middle, crossing transversely, while the columellar fold is oblique and twisted. The peristome is whitish, simple, straight, and sharp, with a columellar margin that is dilated, reflected, and often adnate.

== Distribution ==
This species occurs on the Azores.
