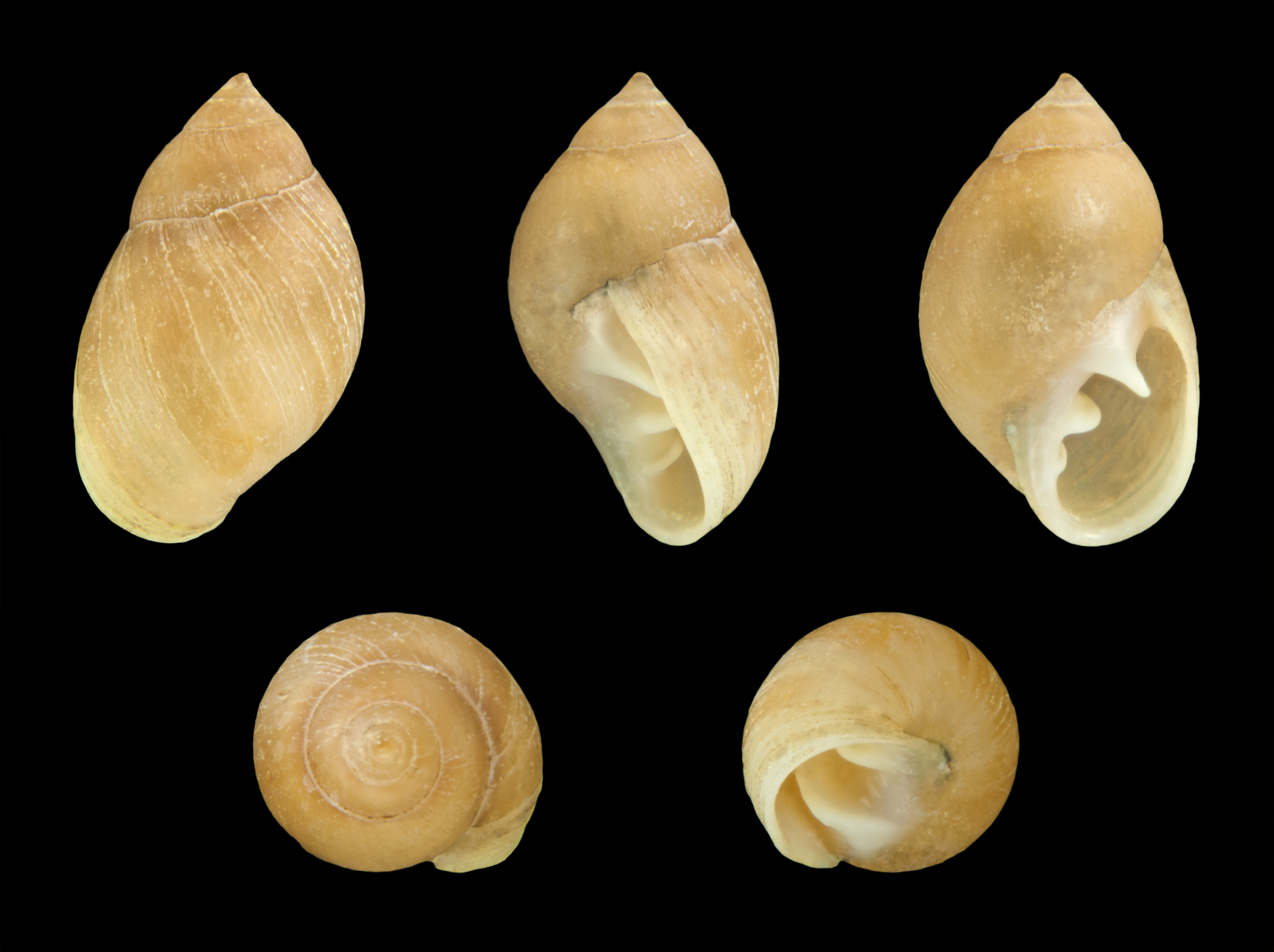

Scientific classification
- Kingdom: Animalia
- Phylum: Mollusca
- Class: Gastropoda
- Order: Ellobiida
- Family: Ellobiidae
- Genus: Marinula
- Species: M. filholi

Binomial name
- Marinula filholi (H. Adams and A. Adams, 1854)

Synonyms
- Marinula chathamensis Finlay, 1928

= Marinula filholi =

Species of gastropod

Marinula filholi is a species of small air-breathing land snail, a terrestrial pulmonate gastropod mollusc in the family Ellobiidae; found in New Zealand.
