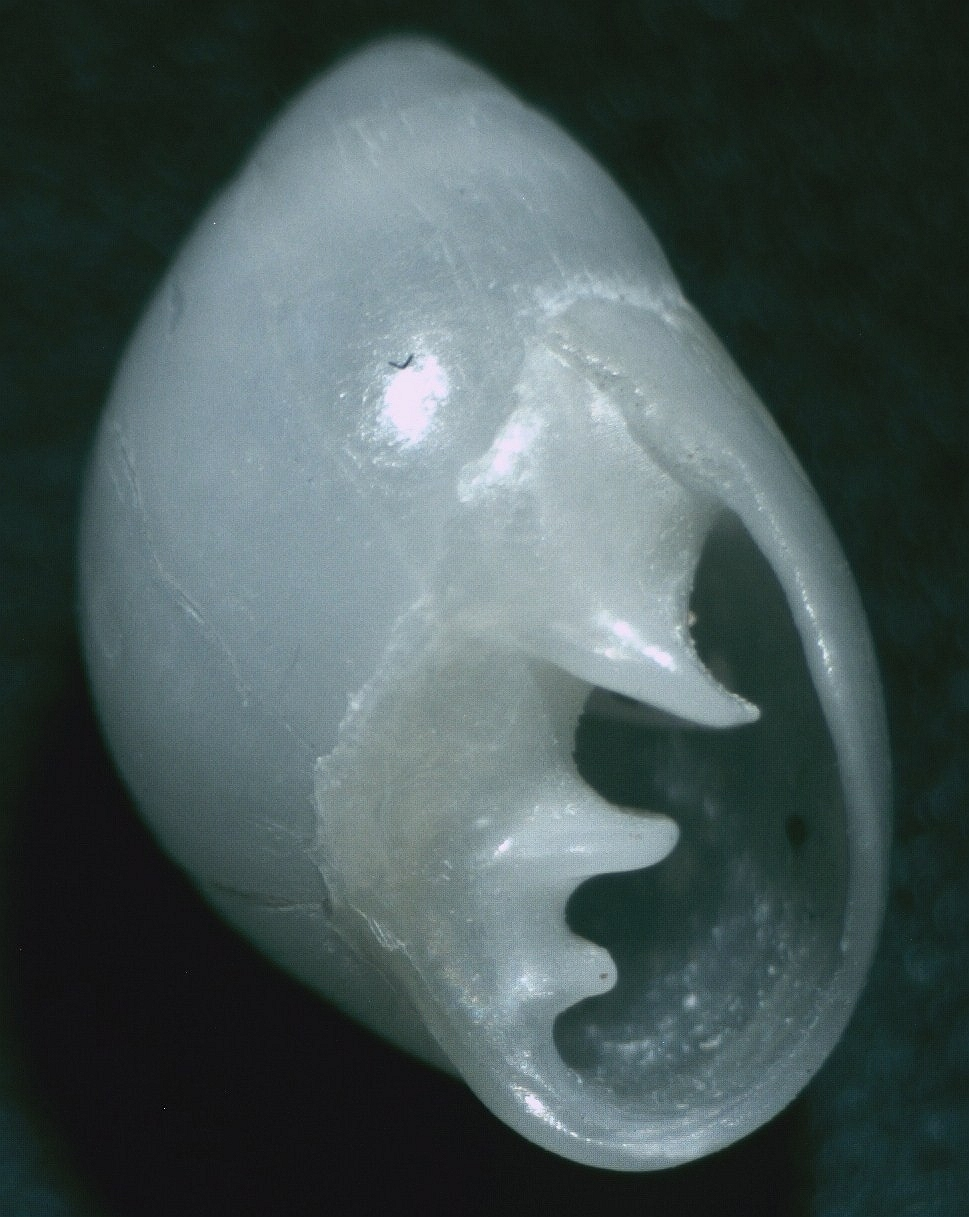
- Marinula xanthostoma

Scientific classification
- Kingdom: Animalia
- Phylum: Mollusca
- Class: Gastropoda
- Order: Ellobiida
- Family: Ellobiidae
- Subfamily: Carychiinae
- Genus: Marinula; King & Broderip, 1832

Synonyms
- Cremnobates Swainson, 1855; Maripythia Iredale, 1936 (unavailable name: no description)

= Marinula =

Genus of gastropods

Marinula is a genus of small air-breathing land snails, terrestrial pulmonate gastropod molluscs in the family Ellobiidae.

This genus is found in New Zealand.

== Species ==
Species within the genus Marinula include:

- Marinula acuta (d'Orbigny, 1835)
- Marinula concinna (C. B. Adams, 1852)
- Marinula filholi Hutton, 1878
- Marinula juanensis
- Marinula maindroni Vélain, 1877
- Marinula parva (Swainson, 1855)
- Marinula pepita King, 1832
- Marinula rhoadsi Pilsbry, 1910
- Marinula striata Odhner, 1924
- Marinula tristanensis Connolly, 1915
- Marinula velaini Connolly, 1915
- Marinula xanthostoma

Species brought into synonymy

- Subgenus Marinula (Monica) H. Adams & A. Adams, 1855: synonym of Ovatella Bivona-Bernardi, 1832
- Marinula affinis (Férussac, 1821): synonym of Pedipes affinis Férussac, 1821
- Marinula chathamensis Finlay, 1928: synonym of Marinula filholi Hutton, 1878
