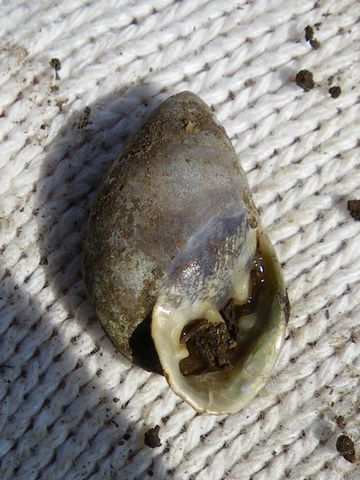
- A live individual of Pythia cecillei.

Scientific classification
- Kingdom: Animalia
- Phylum: Mollusca
- Class: Gastropoda
- Order: Ellobiida
- Superfamily: Ellobioidea
- Family: Ellobiidae
- Genus: Pythia; Röding, 1798

Type species
- Pythia helicina Röding, 1798

Synonyms
- Phytia (Incorrect subsequent spelling); Pythia (Holcomphalia) Möllendorff, 1898 · alternate representation; Pythia (Pythia) Röding, 1798 · accepted, alternate representation; Pythia (Trigonopythia) Kobelt, 1898 · accepted, alternate representation; Scarabus Montfort, 1810

= Pythia (gastropod) =

Genus of gastropods

Pythia is a genus of small air-breathing salt marsh snails, pulmonate gastropod molluscs in the subfamily Pythiinae of the family Ellobiidae.

Pythia is a largely terrestrial genus commonly found in the Indo-Pacific. It lives in mangroves from above high tide to further inland. It is readily differentiated within the family by its dorso-ventrally flattened shell and heavily dentate aperture. Plate gave the first account of Pythia scarabaeus in 1897.

Pythia is the type genus of the subfamily Pythiinae.

== Species ==
According to the World Register of Marine Species, species in the genus Pythia include:

- Pythia albovaricosa L. Pfeiffer, 1853
- Pythia anhi Thach, 2016
- Pythia apiensis E. A. Smith, 1884
- Pythia bischofi I. Rensch, 1937
- † Pythia bonneti (Cossmann, 1895)
- Pythia borneensis (A. Adams, 1851)
- Pythia castanea (Lesson, 1831)
- Pythia cecillii (Philippi, 1847)
- Pythia celebensis L. Pfeiffer, 1855
- Pythia ceylanica L. Pfeiffer, 1853
- Pythia chalcostoma (A. Adams, 1851)
- Pythia chrysostoma Tapparone Canefri, 1883
- Pythia colmani Martins, 1995
- Pythia cumingiana (Petit de la Saussaye, 1843)
- Pythia fimbriosa Möllendorff, 1885
- Pythia imperforata (A. Adams, 1850)
- Pythia inflata L. Pfeiffer, 1853
- Pythia insularis (Hombron & Jacquinot, 1847)
- Pythia lekithostoma Reeve, 1832
- Pythia lozoueti Thach & F. Huber, 2021
- Pythia macgillivrayi L. Pfeiffer, 1855
- Pythia nana Bavay, 1908
- Pythia ovata L. Pfeiffer, 1855
- Pythia pantherina (A. Adams, 1851)
- Pythia perovata Garrett, 1872
- Pythia plicata (Férussac, 1821)
- Pythia pyramidata (Reeve, 1842)
- Pythia savaiensis (Mousson, 1869)
- Pythia scarabaeus (Linnaeus, 1758)
- Pythia semisulcata (A. Adams, 1851)
- Pythia sinuosa (A. Adams, 1851)
- Pythia striata (Reeve, 1842)
- Pythia tortuosa Mousson, 1871
- Pythia trigona (Troschel, 1838)
- Pythia undata (Lesson, 1831)
- Pythia variabilis (Hombron & Jacquinot, 1847)

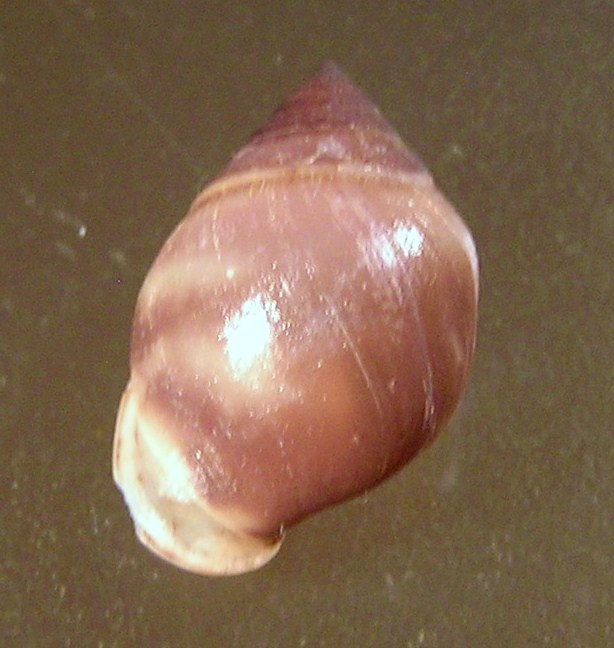
Pythia plicata

Taxon inquirendum

- Pythia albovaricosa Pfeiffer, 1853
- Pythia pachyodon Pilsbry & Y. Hirase, 1908 (taxon inquirendum)

Species brought into synonymy

- Pythia acuminata (Morelet, 1889): synonym of Myosotella myosotis (Draparnaud, 1801) (junior synonym)
- Pythia argenvillei L. Pfeiffer, 1853: synonym of Pythia scarabaeus (Linnaeus, 1758)
- Pythia cecillei (Philippi, 1847): synonym of Pythia cecillii (Philippi, 1847) (unjustified emendation to original species name, Scarabus cecillii Philippi, 1847)
- Pythia ferminii Beck, 1838: synonym of Ovatella firminii (Payraudeau, 1826)
- Pythia gassiesi Crosse, 1895: synonym of Pythia undata (Lesson, 1831) (junior subjective synonym)
- Pythia helicina Röding, 1798: synonym of Pythia scarabaeus (Linnaeus, 1758)
- Pythia letourneuxi (Bourguignat, 1887): synonym of Myosotella denticulata (Montagu, 1803): synonym of Myosotella myosotis (Draparnaud, 1801)
- Pythia petiveriana (Férussac, 1821): synonym of Pythia pantherina (A. Adams, 1851) (junior synonym)
- Pythia reeveana Pfeiffer, 1853: synonym of Pythia pantherina (A. Adams, 1851) (junior synonym)
