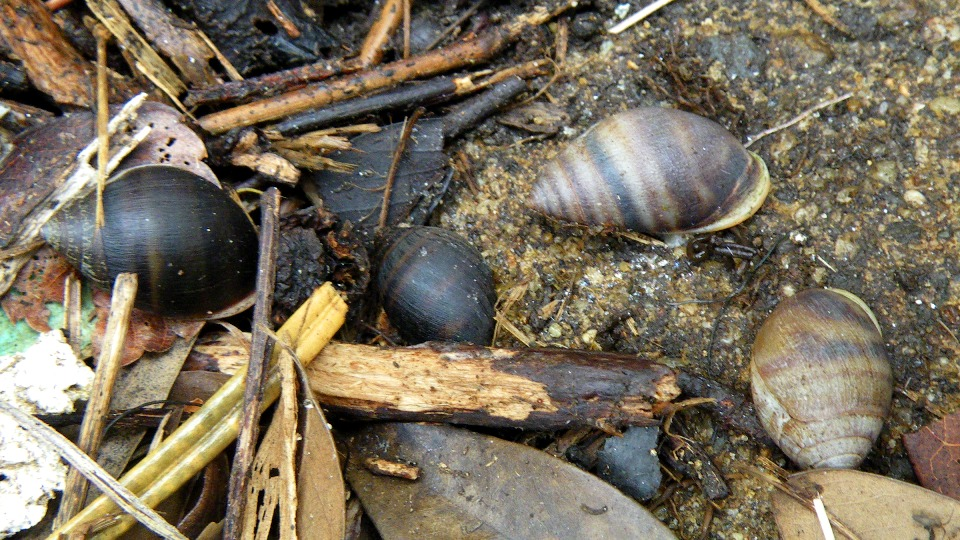
- Live individuals of Pythia cecillii, showing color variation

Scientific classification
- Domain: Eukaryota
- Kingdom: Animalia
- Phylum: Mollusca
- Class: Gastropoda
- Order: Ellobiida
- Family: Ellobiidae
- Genus: Pythia
- Species: P. cecillii

Binomial name
- Pythia cecillii (Philippi, 1847)

Synonyms
- Pythia cecillei (Philippi, 1847) (unjustified emendation to...); Scarabus cecillii Philippi, 1847 (original combination)

= Pythia cecillii =

Species of gastropod

Pythia cecillii is a species of small air-breathing salt marsh snail, a pulmonate gastropod mollusc in the family Ellobiidae.

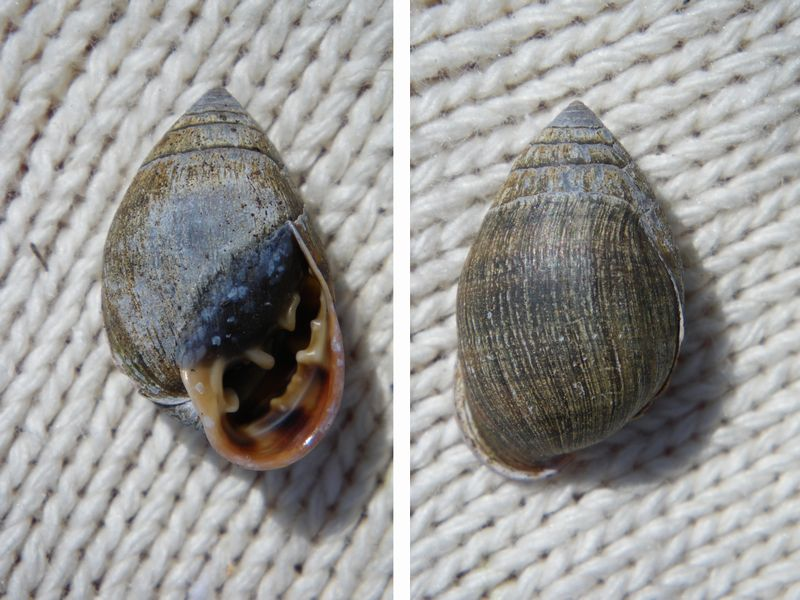
Apertual and abapertural view of a shell of Pythia cecillii.

The specific name cecillii is in honor of the French admiral Jean-Baptiste Cécille.

== Distribution ==
This species occurs in Japan.

It is critically endangered and endangered (CR+EN) in Japan.
