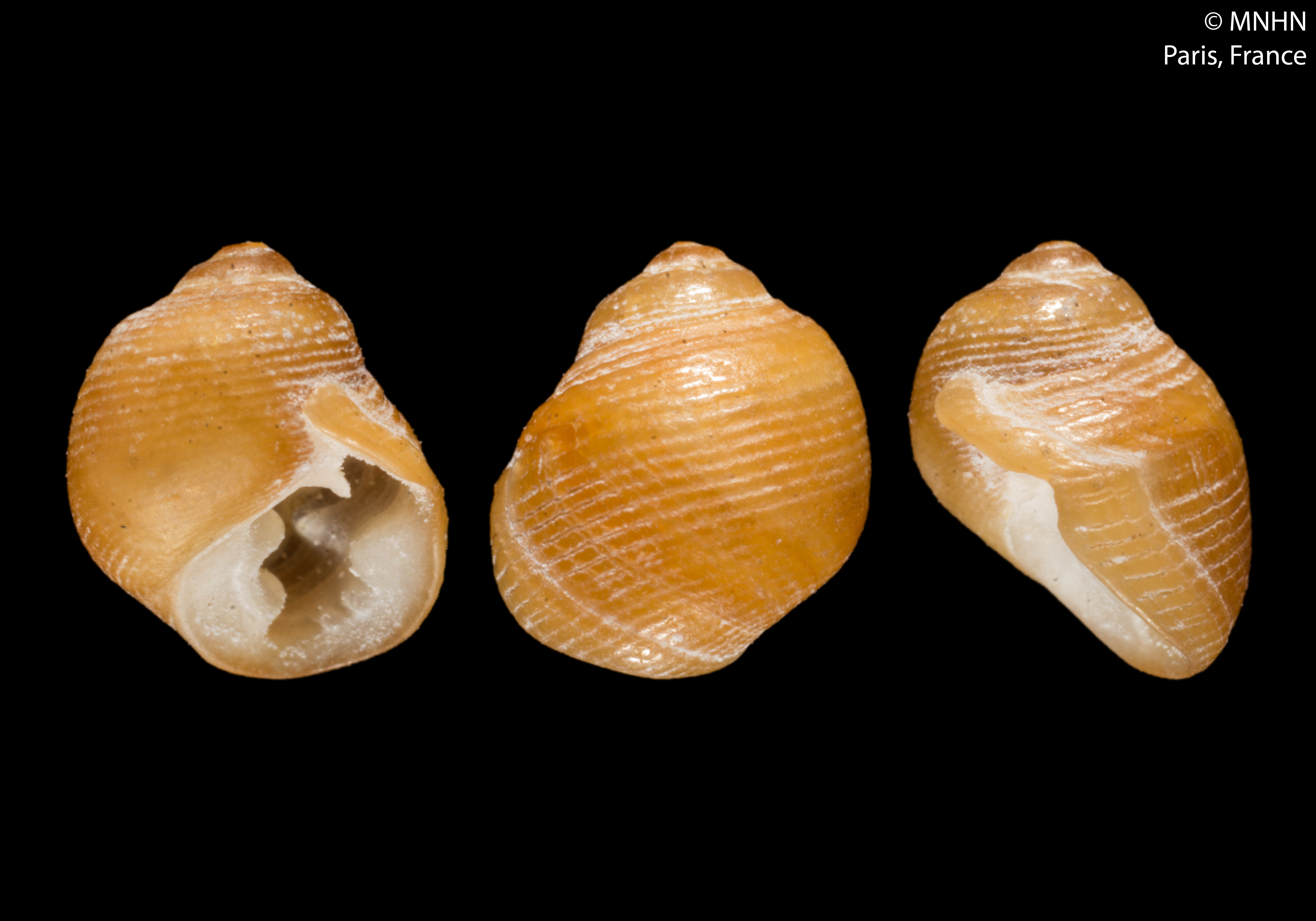
- Shell of Pedipes crassidens (syntype at MNHN, Paris) (taxon inquirendum)

Scientific classification
- Domain: Eukaryota
- Kingdom: Animalia
- Phylum: Mollusca
- Class: Gastropoda
- Order: Ellobiida
- Superfamily: Ellobioidea
- Family: Ellobiidae
- Genus: Pedipes; Férussac, 1821

Type species
- Bulimus pedipes Bruguière, 1789

= Pedipes =

Genus of gastropods

Pedipes is a genus of small air-breathing snails, pulmonate gastropod mollusks in the subfamily Pedipedinae of the family Ellobiidae.

== Species ==
- Pedipes affinis Férussac, 1821
- Pedipes amplicatus (Jickeli, 1874)
- Pedipes angulatus C. B. Adams, 1852
- Pedipes bodomoli Perugia, 2021
- Pedipes deschampsi Ancey, 1887
- Pedipes dohrni d'Ailly, 1896
- Pedipes jouani Montrouzier, 1862
- Pedipes leoniae Ancey, 1887
- Pedipes mirabilis (Megerle von Mühlfeld, 1816)
- † Pedipes mirandus J. Gibson-Smith & W. Gibson-Smith, 1985
- Pedipes moreleti (Pilsbry & Bequaert, 1927)
- Pedipes ovalis C. B. Adams, 1849
- Pedipes pedipes (Bruguière, 1789)
- Pedipes sandwicensis Pease, 1860
- Pedipes unisulcatus Cooper, 1866

Taxa inquirenda

- Pedipes biangulatus S. H. F. Jaeckel, 1927 (use in more recent taxonomic literature currently undocumented)
- Pedipes crassidens Bavay, 1920 (invalid: junior homonym of Pedipes crassidens Melleville, 1843)
- Pedipes globulosus C. B. Adams, 1845
- Pedipes liratulus Kobelt, 1901

Species brought into synonymy

- Pedipes adansonii Blainville, 1824: synonym of Pedipes pedipes (Bruguière, 1789)
- Pedipes afer (Gmelin, 1791): synonym of Pedipes pedipes (Bruguière, 1789)
- Pedipes afra (Gmelin, 1791): synonym of Pedipes pedipes (Bruguière, 1789)
- Pedipes angulata C. B. Adams, 1852: synonym of Pedipes angulatus C. B. Adams, 1852 (wrong gender agreement of the specific epithet)
- † Pedipes crassidens Melleville, 1843: synonym of † Traliopsis crassidens (Melleville, 1843) (new combination)
- Pedipes forestieri Souverbie & Montrouzier, 1864: synonym of Allochroa forestieri (Souverbie & Montrouzier, 1864) (original combination)
- † Pedipes glaber F. E. Edwards, 1852: synonym of † Marinula (Promarinula) glabra (F. E. Edwards, 1852): represented as † Marinula glabra (F. E. Edwards, 1852) (new combination)
- Pedipes granum (Morelet, 1872): synonym of Pedipes moreleti (Pilsbry & Bequaert, 1927)
- Pedipes insularis F. Haas, 1950: synonym of Pedipes ovalis C. B. Adams, 1849
- † Pedipes lapparenti de Raincourt, 1884: synonym of † Marinula (Promarinula) lapparenti (de Raincourt, 1884): represented as † Marinula lapparenti (de Raincourt, 1884) (new combination)
- Pedipes lirata Binney, 1860: synonym of Pedipes angulatus C. B. Adams, 1852 (wrong gender agreement of specific epithet)
- Pedipes liratus Binney, 1860: synonym of Pedipes angulatus C. B. Adams, 1852
- † Pedipes lowii Deshayes, 1863: synonym of † Marinula (Promarinula) lowii (Deshayes, 1863) represented as † marinula lowii (Deshayes, 1863) (new combination)
- † Pedipes marceauxi Deshayes, 1863: synonym of † Marinula (Promarinula) marceauxi (Deshayes, 1863) represented as Marinula marceauxi (Deshayes, 1863) † (new combination)
- Pedipes octanfracta Jonas, 1845: synonym of Laemodonta octanfracta (Jonas, 1845) (original combination)
- † Pedipes pfeifferi Deshayes, 1863: synonym of † Marinula (Promarinula) pfeifferi (Deshayes, 1863): represented as † Marinula pfeifferi (Deshayes, 1863) (new combination)
- Pedipes pietin Dautzenberg, 1910: synonym of Pedipes pedipes (Bruguière, 1789)
- Pedipes quadridens L. Pfeiffer, 1839: synonym of Pedipes mirabilis (Megerle von Mühlfeld, 1816) (probable synonym; see Faber (2004))
- Pedipes unisulcata Cooper, 1866: synonym of Pedipes unisulcatus Cooper, 1866 (wrong gender agreement of specific epithet)
