= Microtralia ovulum =

Scientific classification
- Kingdom: Animalia
- Phylum: Mollusca
- Class: Gastropoda
- Order: Ellobiida
- Family: Ellobiidae
- Genus: Microtralia
- Species: M. ovulum

Binomial name
- Microtralia ovulum (Pfeiffer, 1840)

Synonyms
- Actaeon ovulum (Pfeiffer, 1840); Auricula minuscula (Dall, 1889); Auriculastra nana Haas, 1950; Leuconia occidentalis Pfeiffer, 1854; Microtralia occidentalis (L. Pfeiffer, 1854) junior subjective synonym; Microtralia ovula [sic] (incorrect gender ending); Tornatella ovulum Pfeiffer, 1840; Tralia minuscula Dall, 1889

Species of gastropod

Microtralia ovulum is a species of small air-breathing land snail, a terrestrial gastropod mollusk in the family Ellobiidae, the salt marsh snails.

== Shell description ==
The shell is minute, smooth, yellowish white, with about five whorls beside the minute, rounded, sinistral and with half-immersed nucleus. The spire is moderately elevated and pointed. The sculpture is of fine regular impressed lines, parallel with the incremental striae. The suture is distinct. The last whorl is with nearly parallel sides, rounded and slightly attenuated base. The columella is stout, strongly twisted, white, short. The outer lip is nearly straight, somewhat thickened, especially anteriorly, not lirate or denticulate internally. The shell is with two revolving ridges, the posterior one is fainter and placed in advance of the middle of the whorl. There is a slight wash of callus on the shell.

The aperture is about one-third as wide as the body whorl to the left of it, pointed behind, rounded and slightly oblique in front.

The height of the shell is 3.8 mm. The width of the shell is 2.0 mm. The height of the last whorl is 3.0 mm.

The maximum recorded shell length is 3.8 mm.

== Distribution ==
This species occurs in the Caribbean Sea; also off The Bahamas.
