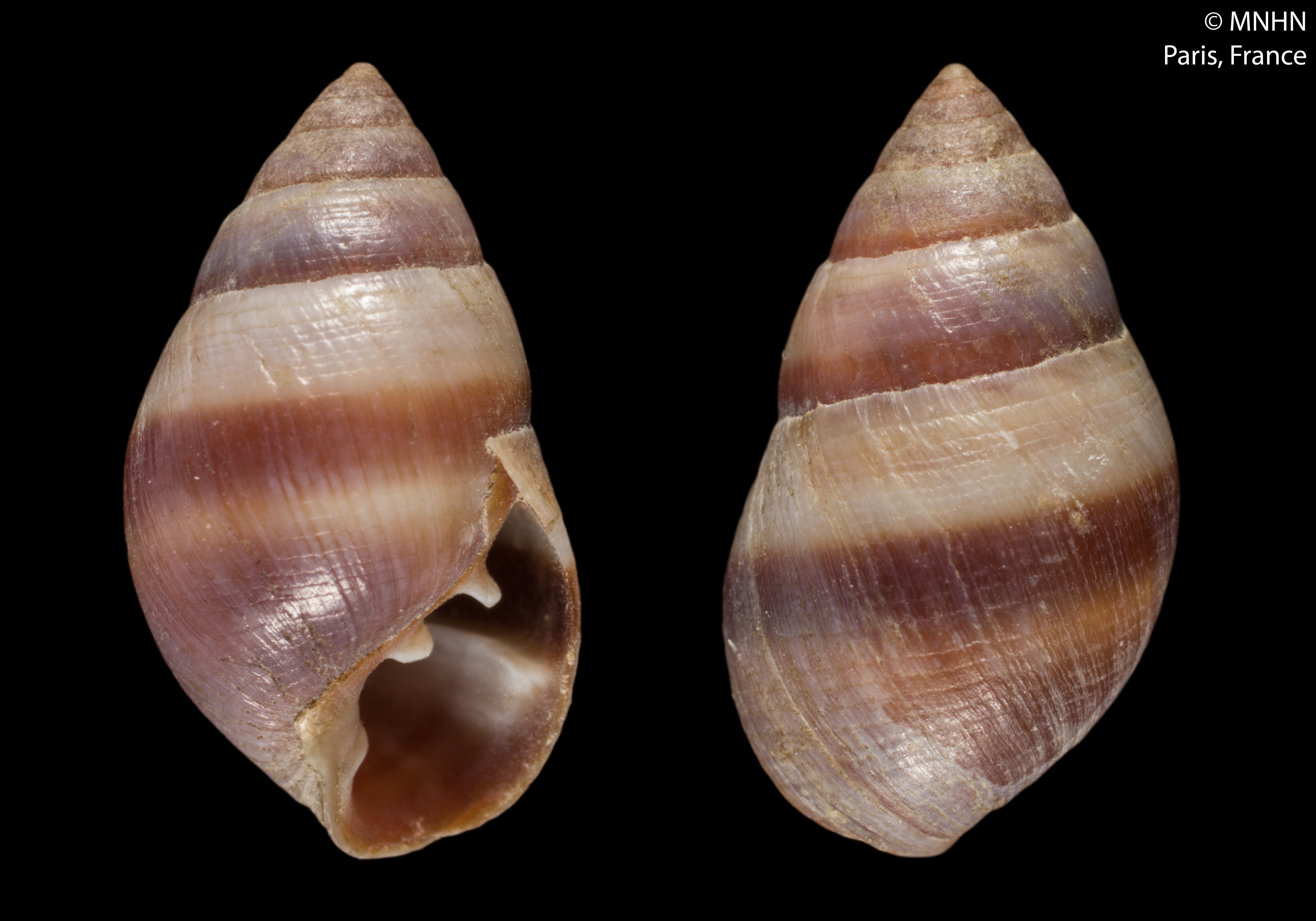
- shell of Allochroa bronnii (paralectotype at MNHN, Paris)

Scientific classification
- Kingdom: Animalia
- Phylum: Mollusca
- Class: Gastropoda
- Order: Ellobiida
- Family: Ellobiidae
- Genus: Allochroa
- Species: A. bronnii

Binomial name
- Allochroa bronnii (R. A. Philippi, 1846)
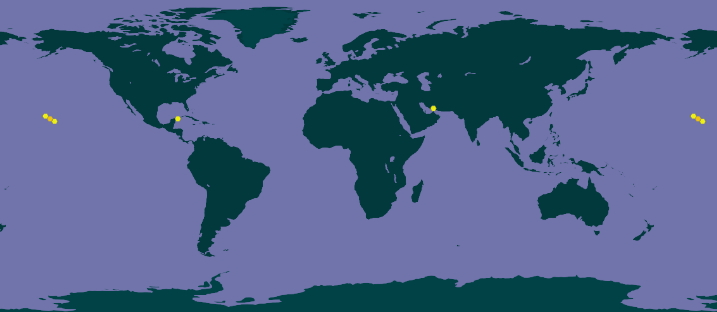

Synonyms
- Allochroa sandwichensis (Souleyet, 1852) junior subjective synonym; Auricula bronnii R. A. Philippi, 1846 superseded combination; Auricula sandwichiensis Souleyet, 1852 junior subjective synonym; Auriculastra bronnii (R. A. Philippi, 1846) superseded combination; Ellobium brownii [sic] misspelling - incorrect subsequent spelling; Laemodonta bronni [sic] (misspelling); Laimodonta bronnii (R. A. Philippi, 1846) superseded combination; Ophicardelus (Laimodonta) sandwichiensis Souleyet, 1852 ·

= Allochroa bronnii =

Species of gastropod

Allochroa bronnii is a species of gastropods belonging to the family Ellobiidae.

== Description ==
(Original description in Latin) The ovate shell is moderately solid and its sculpture shows closely spaced transverse striations The spire is conical, shorter than the aperture and is pale in color. The body whorl is encircled by two broad dark bands. The columella has three folds. The outer lip is sharp, featuring an elevated transverse ridge extending into the aperture.

== Distribution ==
This marine species occurs off Hawaii.
