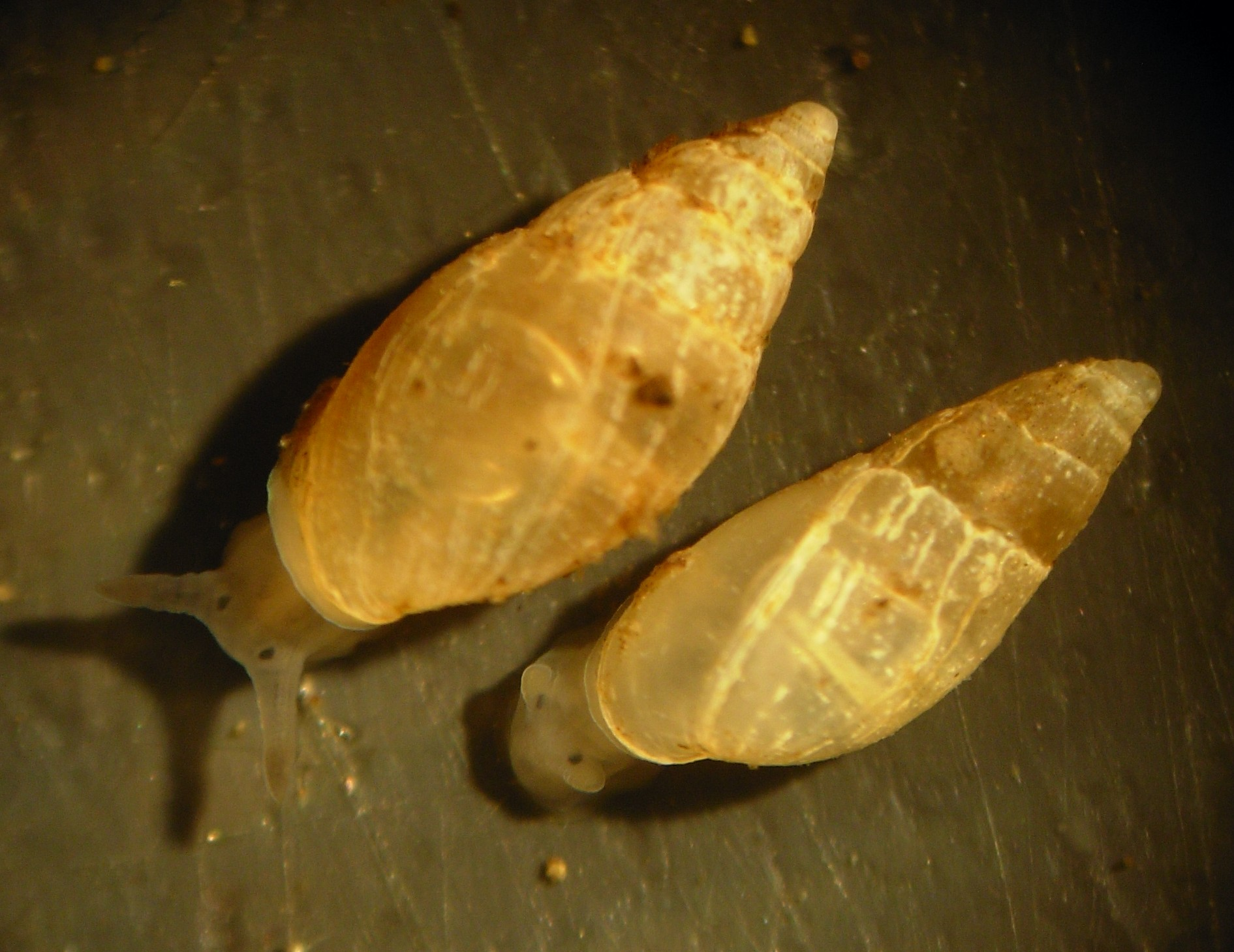
- Leucophytia bidentata on the right and Myosotella myosotis on the left

Scientific classification
- Missing taxonomy template (fix): Leucophytia
- Species: Template:Taxonomy/LeucophytiaL. bidentata

Binomial name
- Template:Taxonomy/LeucophytiaLeucophytia bidentata (Montagu, 1808)

Synonyms
- Alexia bidentata (Montagu, 1808); Alexia kobelti Caruana, 1890 (junior synonym); Alexia paivana L. Pfeiffer, 1866 (junior synonym); Auricula bivonae Philippi, 1841; Auricula erosa Jeffreys, 1830; Auricula micheli Mittre, 1841; Auriculinella (Leucophytia) bidentata (Montagu, 1808) (unaccepted combination); Auriculinella bidentata (Montagu, 1808); Leuconia bidentata (Montagu, 1808) (invalid generic name); Leuconia bivonae (Philippi, 1841); Leuconia micheli (Mittre, 1841) (junior synonym); Ovatella micheli (Mittre, 1841); Voluta alba W. Turton, 1819; Voluta bidentata Montagu, 1808

= Leucophytia bidentata =

Species of gastropod

Leucophytia bidentata is a species of small air-breathing land snail, a terrestrial pulmonate gastropod mollusk in the family Ellobiidae.

== Description ==
For terms see gastropod shell.

The shell is 5–7 mm. high x 2–4 mm.wide. It is either white or horny to reddish brown and the shell has 6-7 very weakly convex whorls. The last whorl is 75% of the shell height and the apex is pointed. The aperture has a white layer at the parietal side, the parietalis (the spiral ridge on the parietal region projecting into the interior of the shell) is usually strong. The columellaris (or internal lip of the shell aperture) is moderately or indistinctly developed. There is no umbilicus.

== Biology ==
This species of snail is semi-marine in habitat.

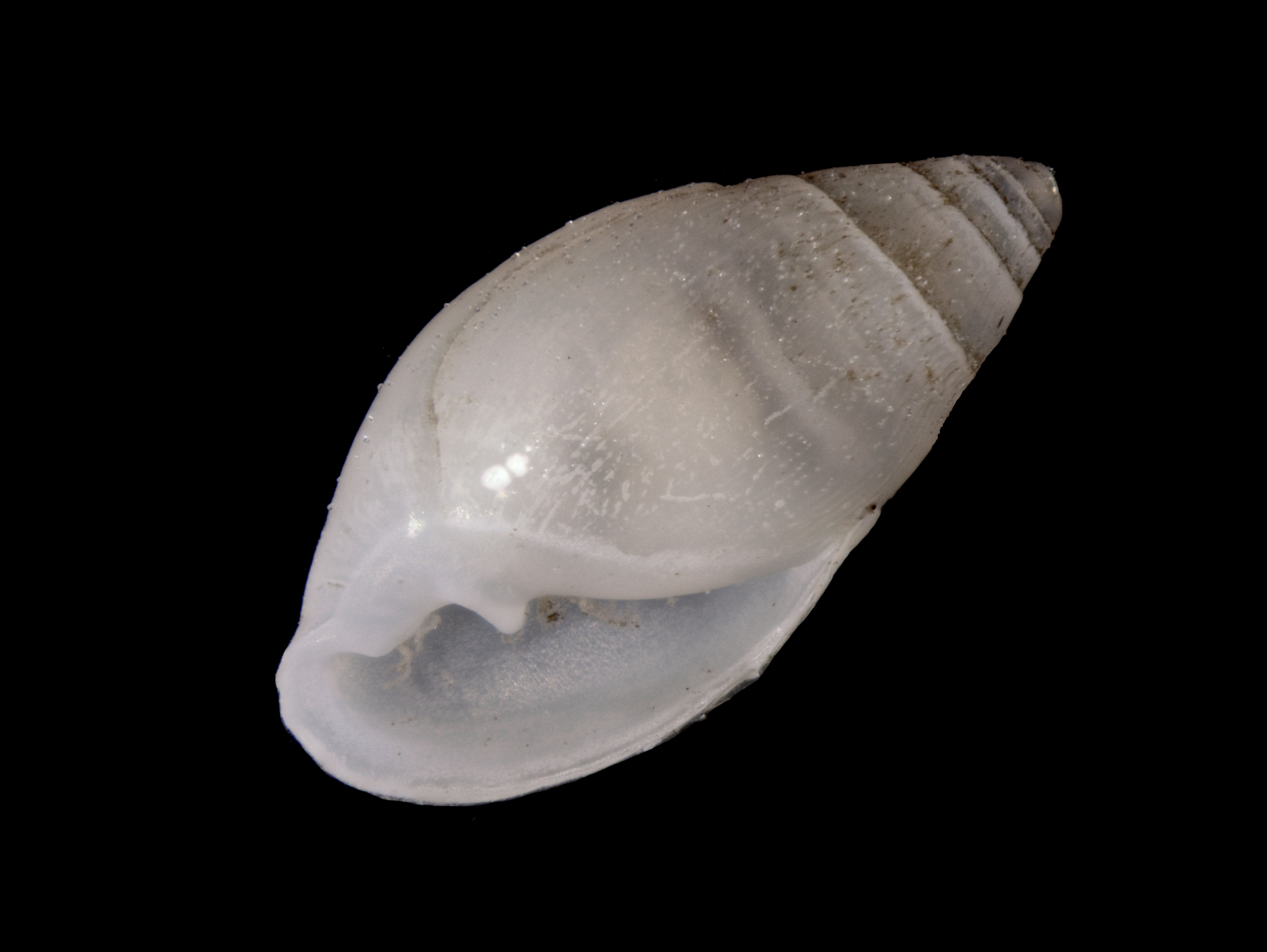
a shell of Leucophytia bidentata

== Distribution ==
This species is found on the coasts of the eastern Atlantic Ocean:

- Belgium
- France
- Great Britain
- Ireland
- The Netherlands

and the Mediterranean Sea:

- Turkey

== Common name ==
The two-toothed white snail.
