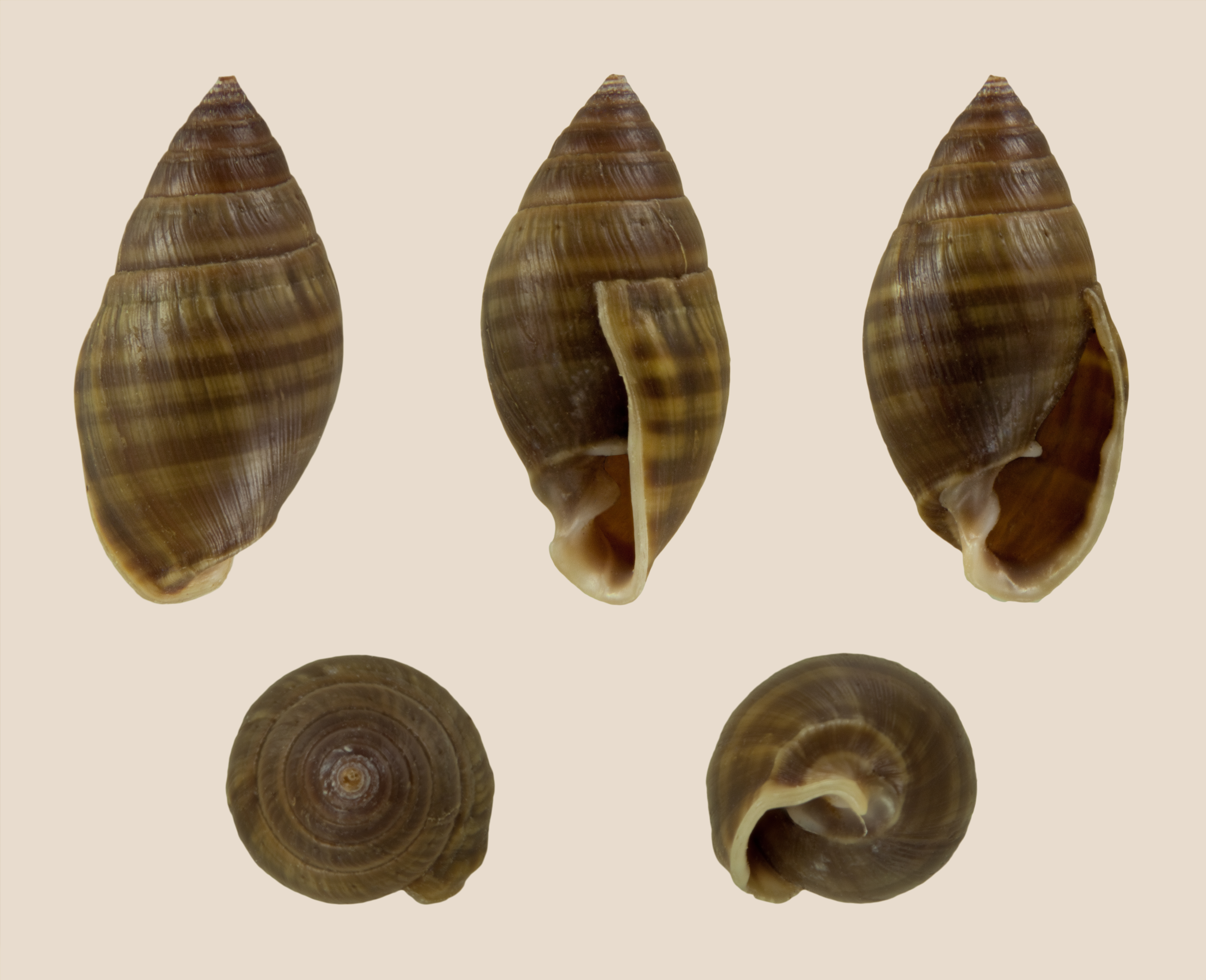
- Pleuroloba costellaris (H. Adams & A. Adams, 1854)

Scientific classification
- Kingdom: Animalia
- Phylum: Mollusca
- Class: Gastropoda
- Order: Ellobiida
- Family: Ellobiidae
- Genus: Pleuroloba; Hyman, Rouse & Ponder, 2005

Type species
- Ophicardelus quoyi H. Adams & A. Adams, 1854

= Pleuroloba =

Genus of gastropods

Pleuroloba is a genus of small air-breathing land snails, terrestrial gastropod mollusks in the family Ellobiidae, the salt marsh snails.

== Species ==
Species within the genus Pleuroloba include:

- Pleuroloba costellaris (H. Adams & A. Adams, 1854)
- Pleuroloba quoyi (H. Adams & A. Adams, 1854)
