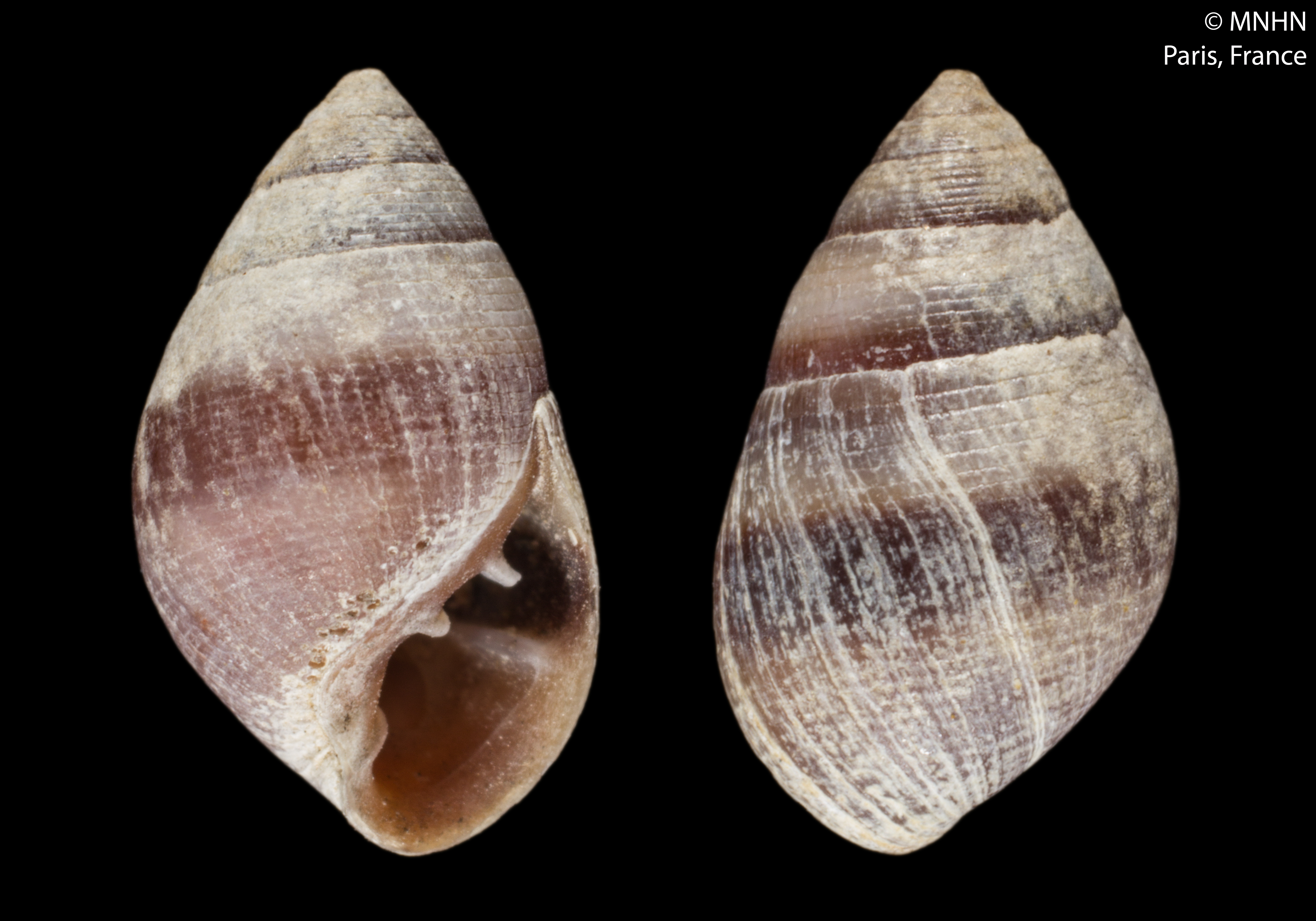
- Shell of Allochroa bronnii

Scientific classification
- Kingdom: Animalia
- Phylum: Mollusca
- Class: Gastropoda
- Order: Ellobiida
- Family: Ellobiidae
- Genus: Allochroa; Ancey, 1887

Type species
- Auricula bronnii R. A. Philippi, 1846

= Allochroa =

Genus of molluscs

Allochroa is a genus of gastropods belonging to the subfamily Pythiinae of the family Ellobiidae.

The species of this genus are found in Australia, Malesia, Pacific Ocean.

Species:

- Allochroa bronnii (Philippi, 1846)
- Allochroa forestieri (Souverbie & Montrouzier, 1864) (taxon inquirendum)
- Allochroa layardi (H.Adams & A.Adams, 1855)
- Allochroa nana Martins, 1995
- Allochroa succinea Perugia, 2010
- Allochroa tenuis Martins, 1995

Synonyms

- Allochroa affinis (Gray, 1825): synonym of Pedipes affinis A. Férussac, 1821
- Allochroa anaaensis (Mousson, 1869): synonym of Allochroa layardi (H. Adams & A. Adams, 1855) (junior synonym)
- Allochroa conica (Pease, 1863: synonym of Allochroa layardi (H. Adams & A. Adams, 1855) (junior subjective synonym)
- Allochroa sandwichensis Souleyet, 1852): synonym of Allochroa bronnii R. A. Philippi, 1846 (junior subjective synonym)
