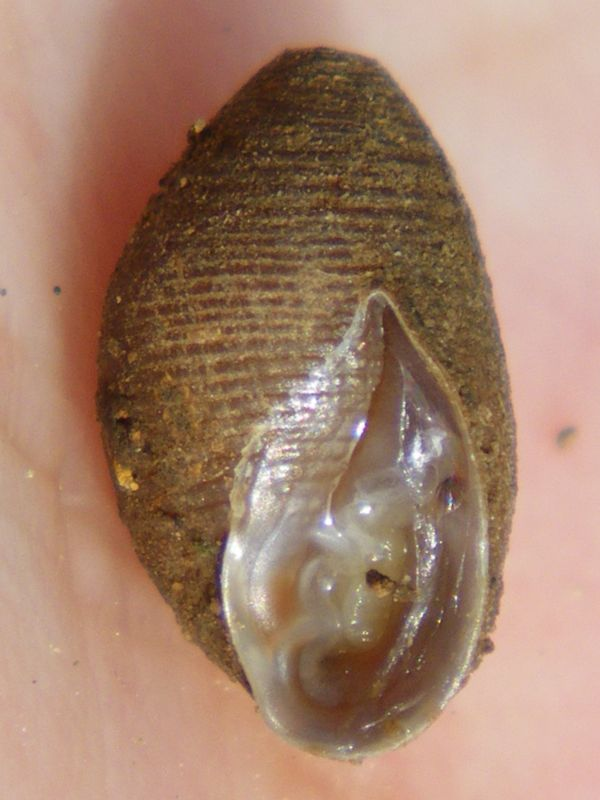
- Laemodonta siamensis, a live animal withdrawn into its shell

Scientific classification
- Kingdom: Animalia
- Phylum: Mollusca
- Class: Gastropoda
- Order: Ellobiida
- Family: Ellobiidae
- Genus: Laemodonta
- Species: L. siamensis

Binomial name
- Laemodonta siamensis (Morelete, 1875)

= Laemodonta siamensis =

Species of gastropod

Laemodonta siamensis is a species of small air-breathing saltmarsh snail, a terrestrial pulmonate gastropod mollusc in the family Ellobiidae.

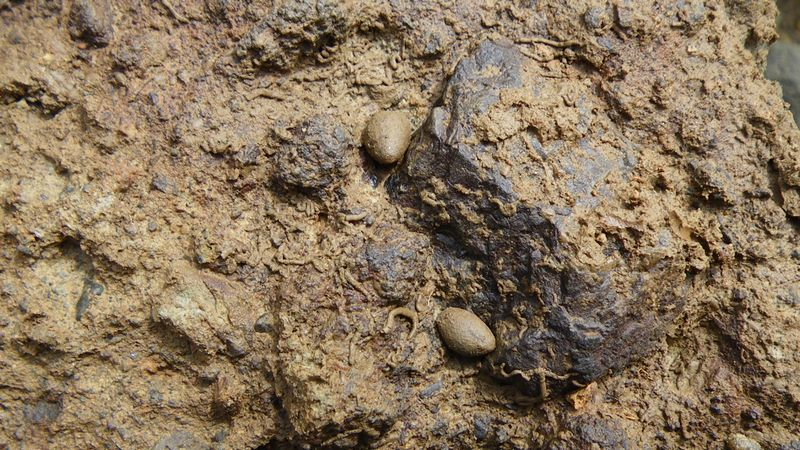
Two live individuals of Laemodonta siamensis in situ

== Distribution ==
The distribution of Laemodonta siamensis includes:

- Japan. It is critically endangered and endangered (CR+EN) in Japan.
- Thailand
- Philippines
