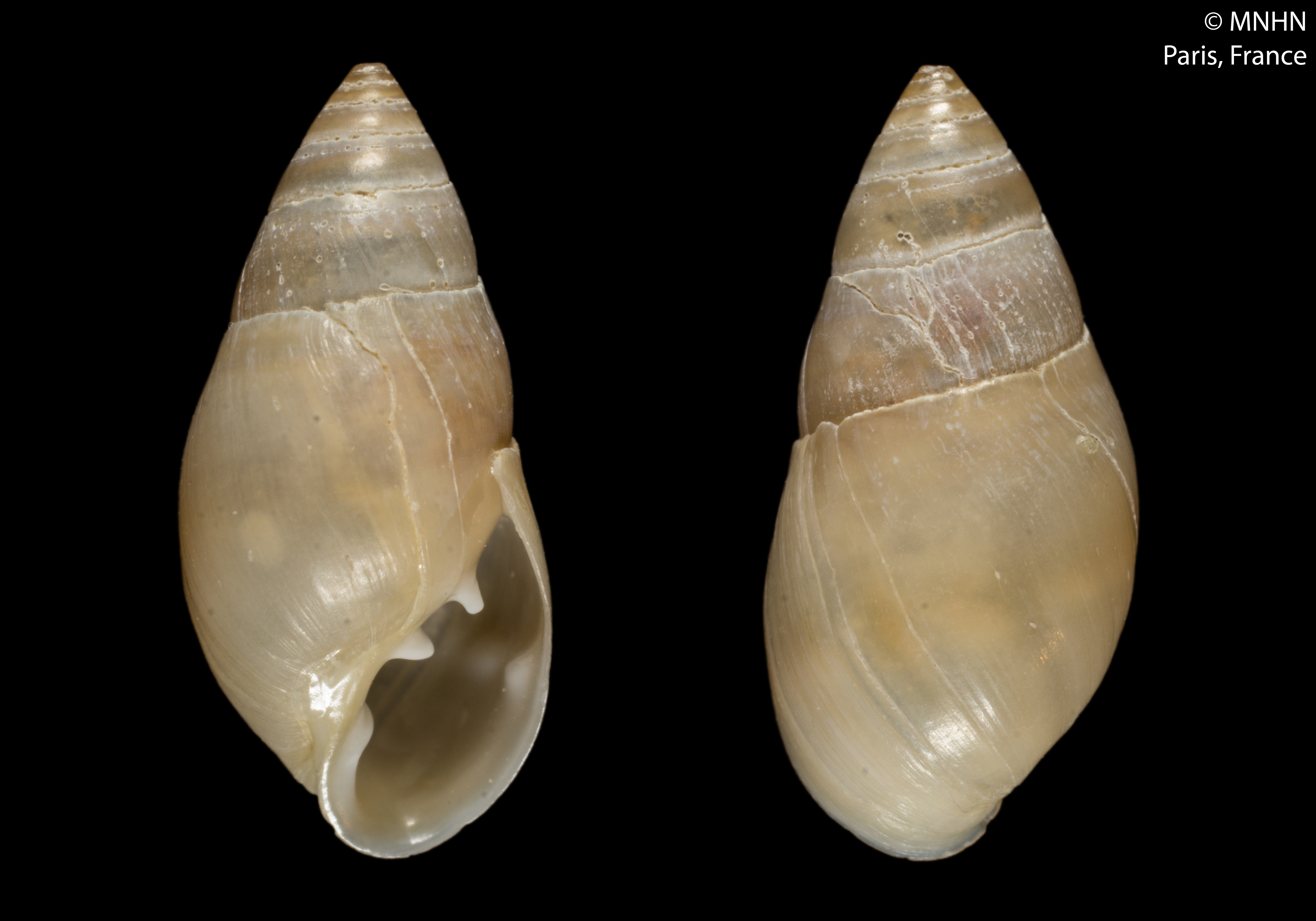
- Ovatella vulcani

Scientific classification
- Domain: Eukaryota
- Kingdom: Animalia
- Phylum: Mollusca
- Class: Gastropoda
- Order: Ellobiida
- Superfamily: Ellobioidea
- Family: Ellobiidae
- Genus: Ovatella; Bivona-Bernardi, 1832

Synonyms
- Marinula (Monica) H. Adams & A. Adams, 1855; Monica H. Adams & A. Adams, 1855

= Ovatella =

Genus of gastropods

Ovatella is a genus of gastropods belonging to the family Ellobiidae.

The species of this genus are found in Europe, Northern Africa and Northern America.

== Species ==
- Ovatella aequalis (R.T.Lowe, 1832)
- Ovatella boettgeri (O.Meyer, 1880)
- Ovatella firminii (Payraudeau, 1827)
- Ovatella gracilis (R.T.Lowe, 1832)
- Ovatella kutschigiana (Küster, 1845)
- Ovatella microstoma (Küster, 1845)
- Ovatella pisolina (Deshayes, 1830)
- Ovatella vulcani (Morelet, 1860)

Synonyms

- Ovatella micheli (Mittre, 1841): synonym of Auriculinella bidentata (Montagu, 1808): synonym of Leucophytia bidentata (Montagu, 1808)
- Ovatella myosotis (Draparnaud, 1801): synonym of Myosotella myosotis (Draparnaud, 1801)
- Ovatella polita Bivona Ant., 1832: synonym of Megastomia conoidea (Brocchi, 1814) (dubious synonym)
- Ovatella punctata Bivona-Bernardi, 1832: synonym of Ovatella firminii (Payraudeau, 1827)
