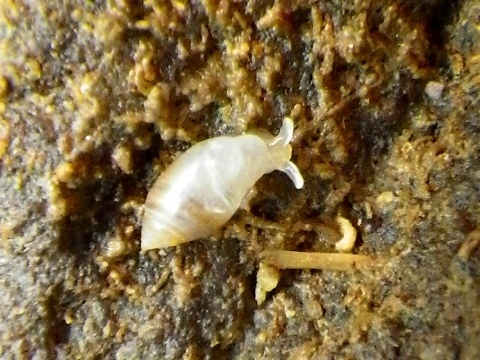
- Microtralia

Scientific classification
- Kingdom: Animalia
- Phylum: Mollusca
- Class: Gastropoda
- Order: Ellobiida
- Family: Ellobiidae
- Genus: Microtralia; Dall, 1894

= Microtralia =

Genus of gastropods

Microtralia is a genus of minute air-breathing land snails, terrestrial gastropod mollusks to micromollusks in the family Ellobiidae, the salt marsh snails.

== Species ==
Species within the genus Microtralia include:

- Microtralia ovulum
- Microtralia insularis
