= Marinula striata =

Scientific classification
- Kingdom: Animalia
- Phylum: Mollusca
- Class: Gastropoda
- Order: Ellobiida
- Family: Ellobiidae
- Genus: Marinula
- Species: M. striata

Binomial name
- Marinula striata Odhner, 1924

Synonyms
- Cremnobates parva Suter, 1913

Species of gastropod

Marinula striata is a species of small air-breathing land snail, a terrestrial pulmonate gastropod mollusc in the family Ellobiidae.

This species is known to occur under stones at the shore line on a number of New Zealand's islands: Antipodes Islands, Auckland Islands, Campbell Island, and Stewart Island.
