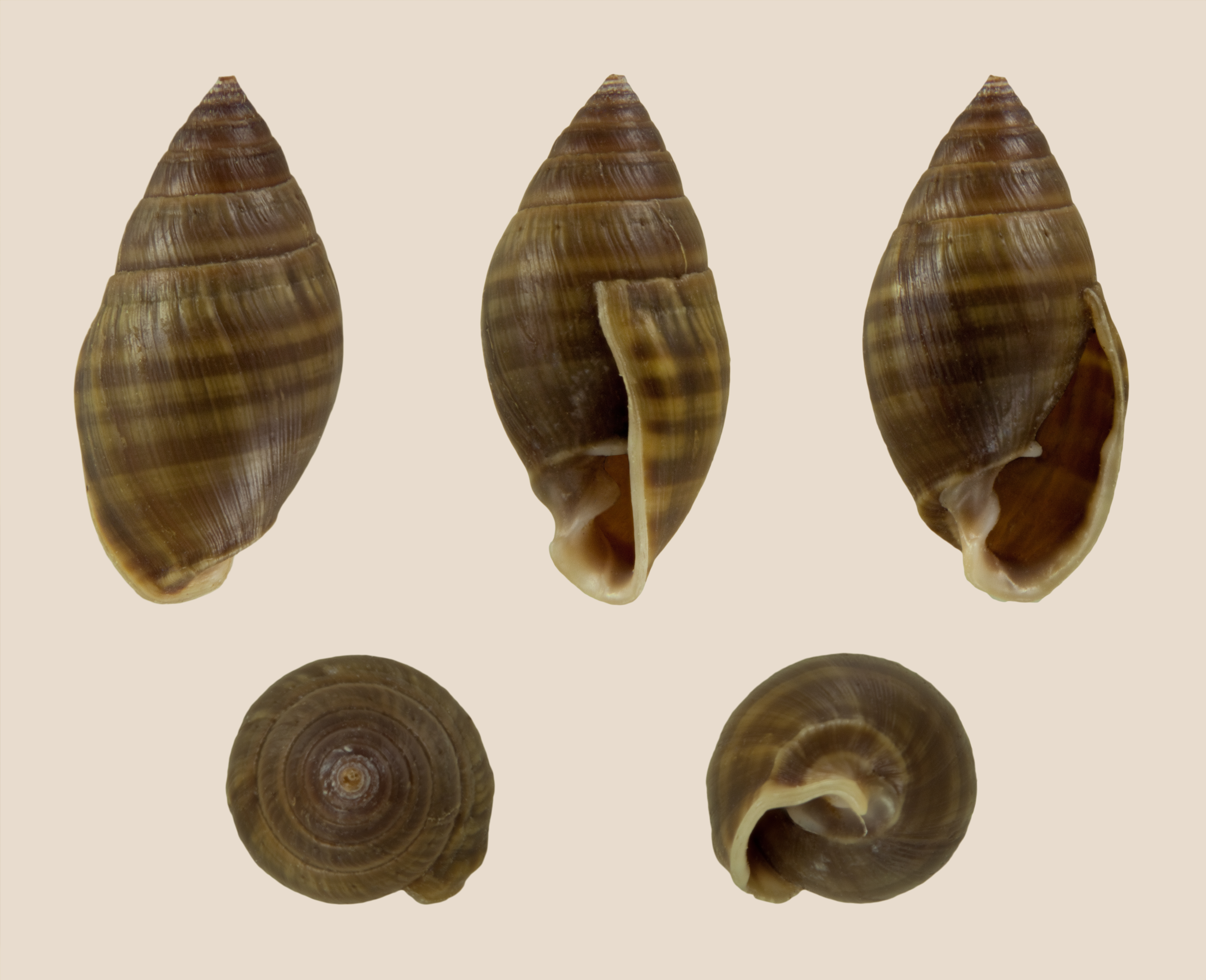

Scientific classification
- Kingdom: Animalia
- Phylum: Mollusca
- Class: Gastropoda
- Order: Ellobiida
- Family: Ellobiidae
- Genus: Pleuroloba
- Species: P. costellaris

Binomial name
- Pleuroloba costellaris (H. Adams and A. Adams, 1854)

Synonyms
- Ophicardelus costellaris (H. Adams and A. Adams, 1854); Melampus costellaris H. Adams and A. Adams, 1854; Ophicardelus australis Suter, 1913

= Pleuroloba costellaris =

Species of gastropod

Pleuroloba costellaris, previously known as Ophicardelus costellaris, is a species of small air-breathing land snail or salt marsh snail, a terrestrial pulmonate gastropod mollusc in the family Ellobiidae.
