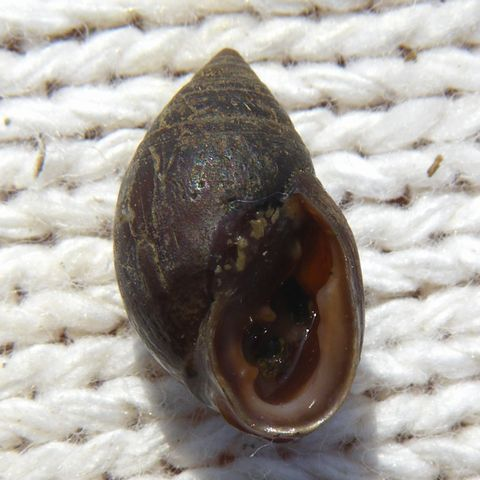
- A shell of Cassidula plecotrematoides subspecies japonica

Scientific classification
- Kingdom: Animalia
- Phylum: Mollusca
- Class: Gastropoda
- Order: Ellobiida
- Superfamily: Ellobioidea
- Family: Ellobiidae
- Genus: Cassidula; Férussac, 1821

Type species
- Bulimus aurisfelis Bruguière, 1789

Synonyms
- Auricula (Cassidula) Férussac, 1821; Cassidula (Cassidula) Férussac, 1821; Cassidula (Cassidulta) Strand, 1942; Cassidulella Thiele, 1934 (invalid: junior homonym of Cassidulella Strand, 1928 [Coleoptera]; Cassidulta is a replacement name); Cassidulina Thiele, 1931 (invalid: junior homonym of Cassidulina d'Orbigny, 1826 [Foraminifera]; Cassidulella and Cassidulta are replacement names); Cassidulus Beck, 1838; Melosidula B.J. Smith & Kershaw, 1979; Melampus (Rhodostoma) Swainson, 1840; Rhodostoma Swainson, 1840; Sidula J. E. Gray, 1840

= Cassidula =

Genus of gastropods

Cassidula is a genus of small air-breathing salt marsh snails, pulmonate gastropod mollusks in the family Ellobiidae. Cassidula aurisfelis is known as Angulated Shoulder Earsnail, Angulate Vassidula or cat's Ear Cassidula in English (Smith, 1992). It belongs to the great division or phylum called the Mollusca and from class of Gastropoda.

== Species and subspecies ==
- Cassidula angulifera (Petit, 1841)
- Cassidula aurisfelis (Bruguière, 1789)
- Cassidula crassiuscula Mousson, 1869
- Cassidula doliolum (Petit de la Saussaye, 1842)
- Cassidula faba (L. Pfeiffer, 1853)
- Cassidula granosula (Iredale, 1936)
- Cassidula labio von Möllendorff, 1887
- Cassidula labrella (Deshayes, 1830)
- Cassidula multiplicata (Martens, 1865)
- Cassidula nucleus (Gmelin, 1791)
- Cassidula paludosa (Garrett, 1872)
- Cassidula philippinarum Hidalgo, 1888
- Cassidula plecotrematoides Möllendorff, 1901
  - Cassidula plecotrematoides japonica Möllendorff, 1901
- Cassidula rugata (Menke, 1843)
- Cassidula schmackeriana Möllendorff, 1895
- Cassidula sowerbyana (Pfeiffer, 1853)
- Cassidula sulculosa (Mousson, 1849)
- Cassidula vespertilionis (Lesson, 1831)
- Cassidula zonata H. Adams & A. Adams, 1855

Species brought into synonymy

- Cassidula bilabiata Hedley, 1912: synonym of Cassidula zonata H. Adams & A. Adams, 1855
- Cassidula corona (Gmelin, 1791): synonym of Melongena corona (Gmelin, 1791)
- Cassidula decussata H. Adams & A. Adams, 1855: synonym of Cassidula sowerbyana (Pfeiffer, 1853)
- Cassidula kraussi (Küster, 1844): synonym of Cassidula labrella (Deshayes, 1830) (junior synonym)
- Cassidula lutescens Pfeiffer, 1856: synonym of Cassidula labrella (Deshayes, 1830) (junior synonym)
- Cassidula mustelina (Deshayes, 1830): synonym of Cassidula nucleus (Gmelin, 1791) (junior synonym)
