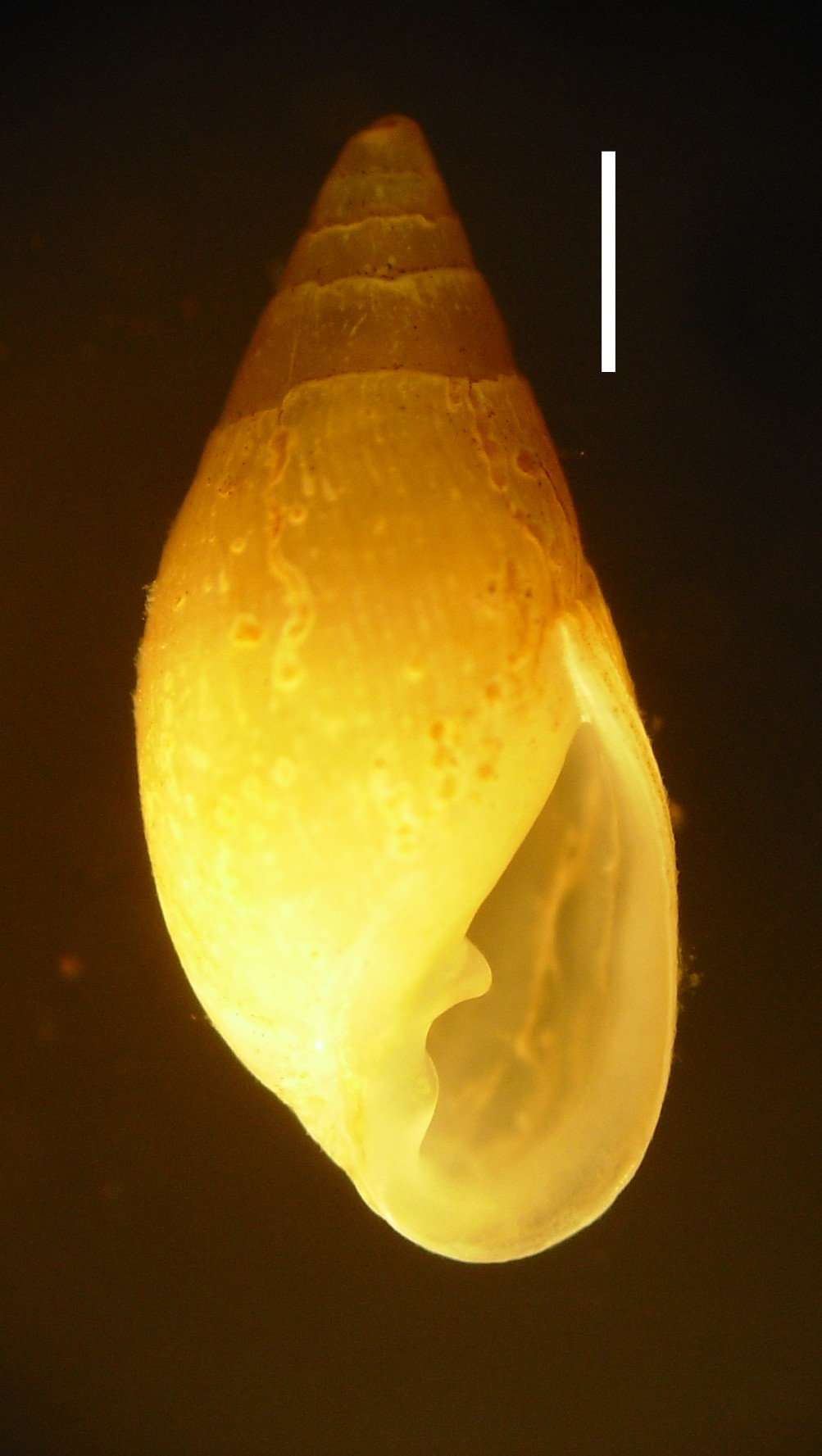
- A shell of Leucophytia bidentata

Scientific classification
- Kingdom: Animalia
- Phylum: Mollusca
- Class: Gastropoda
- Order: Ellobiida
- Family: Ellobiidae
- Genus: Leucophytia; Winckworth, 1949

Synonyms
- Auriculinella (Leucophytia) Winckworth, 1949; Conovulus (Leuconia) Gray, 1840 ·; Leuconia Gray, 1840 (Invalid: junior homonym of Leuconia Grant, 1833 [Porifera]; Leucopepla and Leucophytia are replacement names); Leucopepla Peile, 1926 (Replacement name for Leuconia Gray, 1840, non Grant, 1833; invalid: junior homonym of Leucopepla Kirkaldy, 1907)

= Leucophytia =

Genus of gastropods

Leucophytia is a genus of small air-breathing land snails, terrestrial pulmonate gastropod mollusks in the family Ellobiidae.

== Species ==
- Leucophytia bidentata (Montagu, 1808)
- † Leucophytia dujardini (Tournouër, 1872)
- † Leucophytia elegans (Degrange-Touzin, 1892)
- † Leucophytia serresi (Tournouër, 1872)
