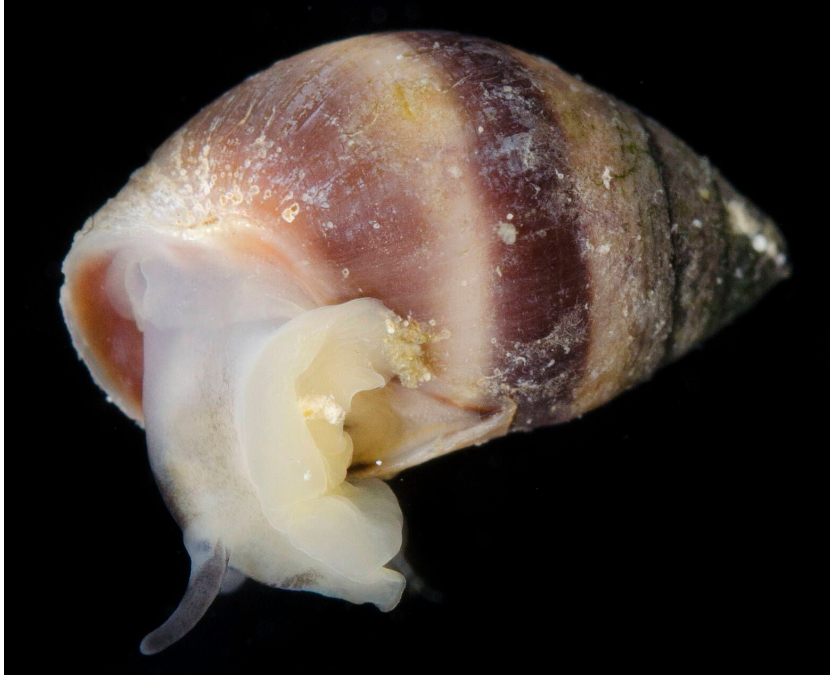
- Animal and shell of Allochroa layardi (specimen at the Smithsonian Institution)

Scientific classification
- Domain: Eukaryota
- Kingdom: Animalia
- Phylum: Mollusca
- Class: Gastropoda
- Order: Ellobiida
- Family: Ellobiidae
- Genus: Allochroa
- Species: A. layardi

Binomial name
- Allochroa layardi (H.Adams & A.Adams, 1855)
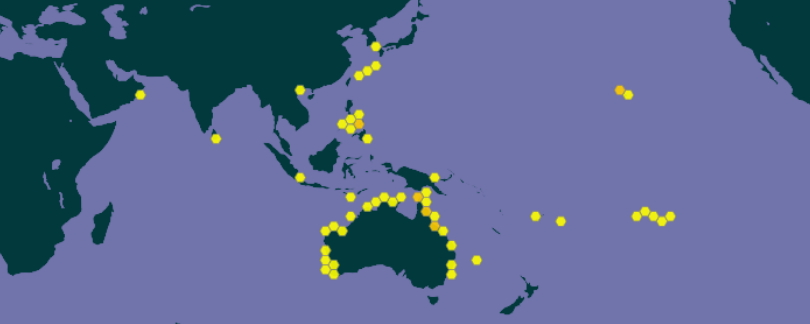

Synonyms
- Allochroa anaaensis (Mousson, 1869) (junior synonym); Allochroa conica (Pease, 1863 junior subjective synonym; Ellobium conica (Pease, 1863) junior subjective synonym; Laemodonta conica (Pease, 1863); Laimodonta anaaensis Mousson, 1869; Laimodonta bronnii var. producta Dautzenberg & H. Fischer, 1905; Laimodonta conica Pease, 1863 junior subjective synonym; Laimodonta conica var. conicoides Tapparone Canefri, 1883; Laimodonta pfeifferi Dunker in Pfeiffer, 1860; Ophicardelus (Laimodonta) layardi H. Adams & A. Adams, 1855 (original combination); Ophicardelus layardi H. Adams & A. Adams, 1855 (original combination)

= Allochroa layardi =

Species of gastropod

Allochroa layardi is a species of gastropods belonging to the family Ellobiidae.

== Description ==
(Original description in Latin) The ovate-conical shell is reddish-brown and shows a broad, transverse white band. The spire is elevated. The apex is pointed. The whorls are flat and transversely grooved. The aperture is ovate. The columella has three folds, the posterior folds strong. The inner lip has inside a single lamella and has a sharp-edged margin.

== Distribution ==
The species is found in littoral and supralittoral zones of Australia, Malesia, Sri Lanka; Indo-Pacific Ocean from Mauritius to Hawaii.
