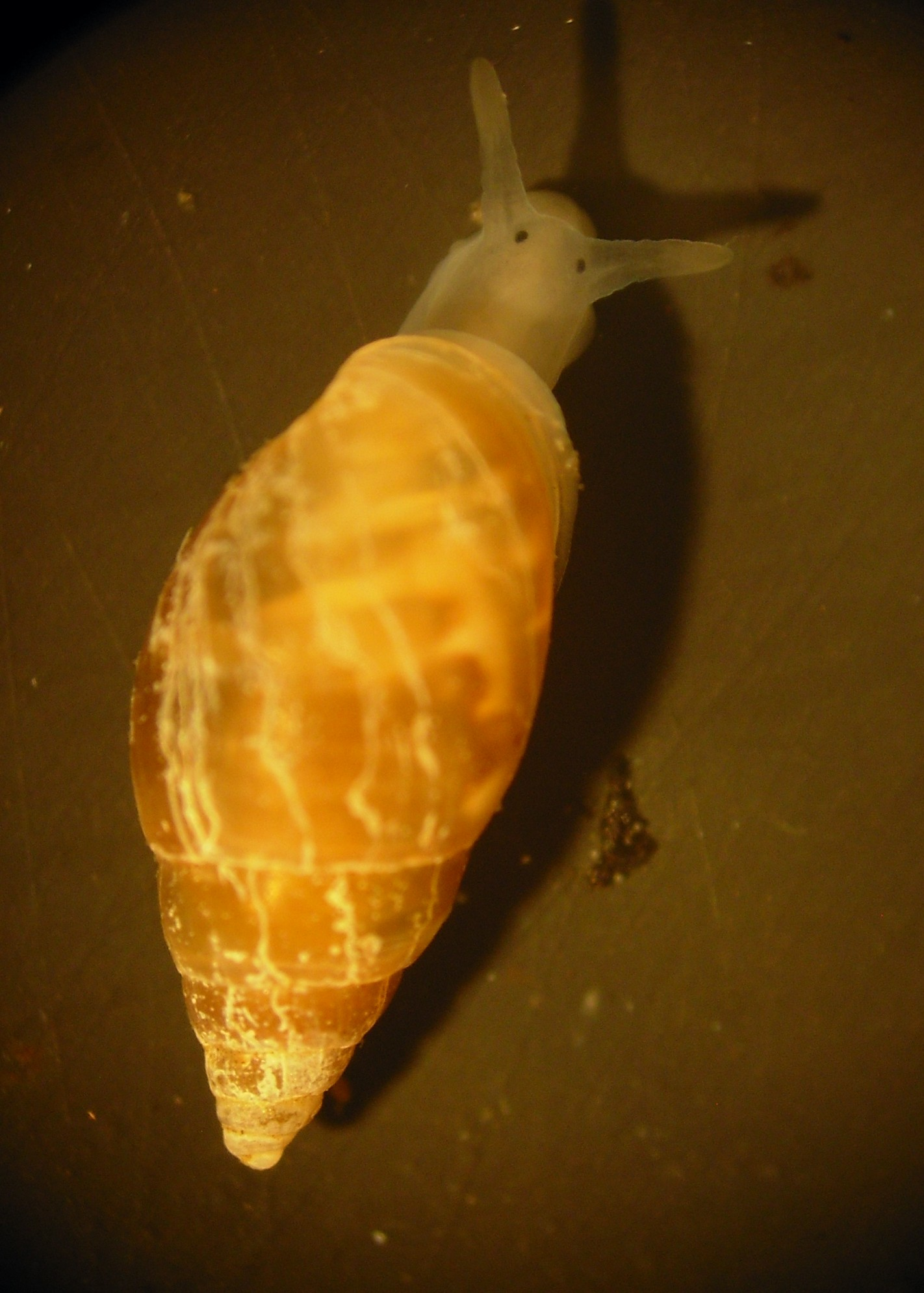
- Live Myosotella myosotis

Scientific classification
- Domain: Eukaryota
- Kingdom: Animalia
- Phylum: Mollusca
- Class: Gastropoda
- Order: Ellobiida
- Family: Ellobiidae
- Genus: Myosotella
- Species: M. myosotis

Binomial name
- Myosotella myosotis (Draparnaud, 1801)

Synonyms
- see "List of Synonyms"

= Myosotella myosotis =

Species of gastropod

Myosotella myosotis, common name the mouse ear snail, is a European species of small salt marsh snail, a terrestrial pulmonate gastropod mollusc in the family Ellobiidae.

== Description ==
For terms see gastropod shell.

The shell varies from yellowish to brownish in color and can be either smooth or finely striated, with a shiny surface. It typically features 7 to 8 slightly convex whorls. The apertural margin is white, often accompanied by a white layer on the parietal side. The parietalis is robust, horizontal, and often accompanied by a smaller secondary parietalis. The columellaris is also strong, and the umbilicus is usually covered. The form denticulata is characterized by 3 to 6 short, thin folds resembling droplets near the palatal margin of the inner lip.

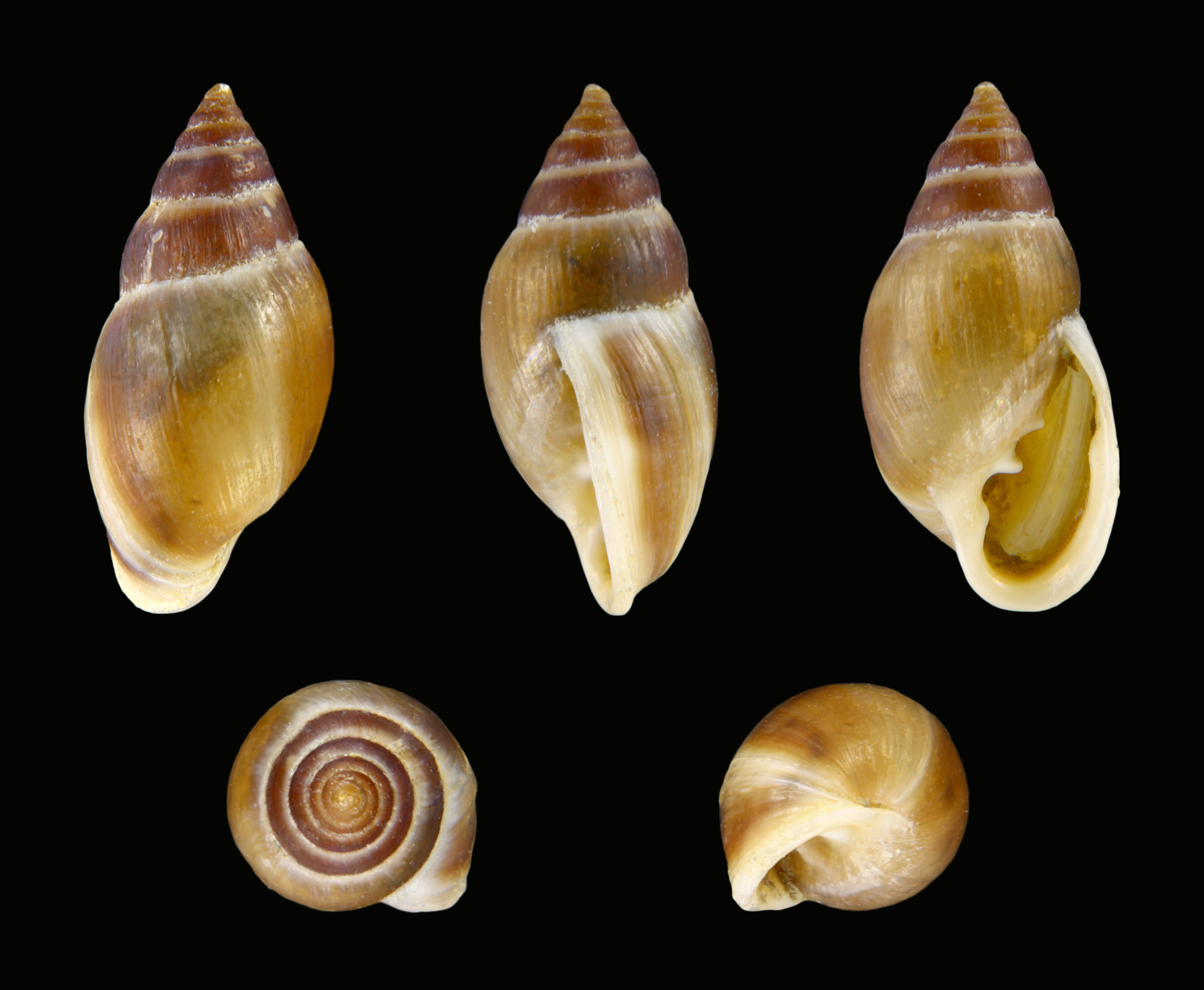
Photo of the shell

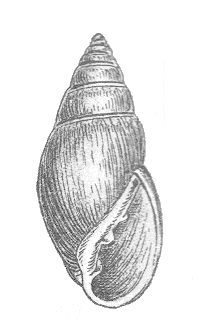
Drawing of the shell

== Molecular phylogenetics ==
The complete nucleotide sequence of the mitochondrial genome of Myosotella myosotis has been available since 2008.

== Distribution ==
As a native snail this species is found in the following countries and islands:

- Belgium
- Netherlands
- Great Britain
- Ireland
- Mediterranean Sea coasts (Spain, Italy, Istria, Dalmatia, Albania, Greece, West and South Turkey), West European coasts to Ireland and Scotland, Black Sea, North Germany (and Baltic Sea).

As an exotic, this species is found on:

- The West Coast of North America
- The East Coast of North America

== Description ==
The maximum recorded shell length is 12 mm.

== Habitat ==
This species lives right at sea level (at the highest high-tide level), and so therefore the minimum recorded depth for this species is 0 m, and the maximum recorded depth is 0 m.

== Synonyms ==
- Alexia (Auricula) myosotis (Draparnaud, 1801)
- Alexia (Auricula) myosotis var. hiriarti de Folin, 1889
- Alexia (Leuconia) micheli var. elongata Pallary, 1900
- Alexia (Leuconia) micheli var. incrassata Pallary, 1900
- Alexia algerica Bourguignat, 1864
- Alexia balearica Dohrn & Heynemann, 1862
- Alexia cossoni Bourguignat, 1887
- Alexia enhalia Bourguignat, 1887
- Alexia loweana Pfeiffer, 1866
- Alexia myosotis (Draparnaud, 1801)
- Alexia myosotis var. varicosa Fenaux, 1939
- Alexia obsoleta Pfeiffer, 1854
- Alexia parva Locard, 1893
- Alexia pechaudi Bourguignat, 1887
- Auricula (Alexia) meridionalis Brazier, 1877
- Auricula biasolettiana Küster, 1844
- Auricula botteriana Philippi, 1846
- Auricula ciliata Morelet, 1845
- Auricula dubia Cantraine, 1835
- Auricula kutschigiana Küster, 1844
- Auricula meridionalis Brazier, 1877
- Auricula microstoma Küster, 1844
- Auricula myosotis Draparnaud, 1801
- Auricula myosotis var. adriatica Küster, 1844
- Auricula myosotis var. elongata Küster, 1844
- Auricula tenella Menke, 1830
- Auricula veneta Martens, 1884
- Auricula venetiensis Megerle von Mühlfeld in Villa A. & G.B., 1841
- Auricula vespertina Morelet, 1860
- Auricula watsoni Wollaston, 1878
- Melampus turritus W. G. Binney, 1859(junior synonym)
- Melampus gracilis Lowe, 1832
- Myosotella denticulata (Montagu, 1803) ·
- Ovatella myosotis (Draparnaud, 1801)
- Ovatella myosotis salentina Palazzi & Curini Galletti, 1982
- Phytia letourneuxi var. tanousi Pallary, 1912
- Phytia myosotis (Draparnaud, 1801)
- Tralia (Alexia) myosotis (Draparnaud, 1801)
- Tralia (Alexia) myosotis f. junior Dall, 1885
- Voluta denticulata Montagu, 1803 (original combination)
- Voluta ingens W. Turton, 1819
- Voluta reflexa W. Turton, 1819
- Voluta ringens W. Turton, 1819
