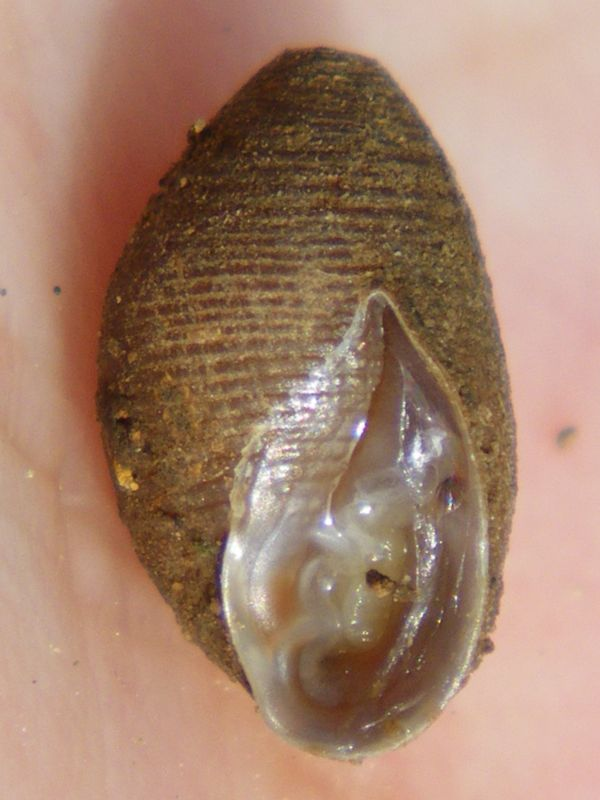
- A live but retracted individual of Laemodonta siamensis on a human hand. A partially torn epiphragm of dried mucus is visible in the aperture of the shell

Scientific classification
- Kingdom: Animalia
- Phylum: Mollusca
- Class: Gastropoda
- Order: Ellobiida
- Superfamily: Ellobioidea; Pfeiffer, 1854
- Family: Ellobiidae; Pfeiffer, 1854

Diversity
- About 250 valid specific names

Synonyms
- Melampidae Stimpson, 1851

= Ellobiidae =

Family of gastropods

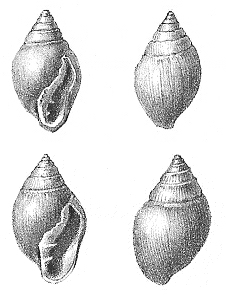
Drawing of shells of Ellobium pyramidale.

Ellobiidae, common name the hollow-shelled snails, is a family of small air-breathing land, marine, and brackish snails; pulmonate gastropod mollusks in the clade Eupulmonata. Ellobiidae is the only family in the superfamily Ellobioidea, according to the taxonomy of the Gastropoda by Bouchet & Rocroi, 2005).

== Anatomy ==
In this family, the number of haploid chromosomes lies between 16 and 20 (according to the values in this table).

They have a distinctive mode of locomotion arising due to a split sole. The front part of the sole adheres to the substrate and then the rear part of the sole is drawn up to the front part.

== Taxonomy ==
Species are traditionally classified into five taxonomic groups, the Pythiidae, the Laemodontidae, the Melampodidae, the Ellobiidae and the Carychiidae. These taxa have been recognized either as families within Ellobioidea or as sub-families within the family Ellobiidae.

The family Ellobiidae consists of the following subfamilies (according to the taxonomy of the Gastropoda by Bouchet & Rocroi, 2005):

- subfamily Ellobiinae Pfeiffer, 1854 (1822)
- subfamily Carychiinae Jeffreys, 1830
- subfamily Melampinae Stimpson, 1851 (1850)
- subfamily Pedipedinae P. Fischer & Crosse, 1880
- subfamily Pythiinae Odhner, 1925 (1880)
- † subfamily Zaptychiinae Wenz, 1938

The high degree of homoplasy in morphological characters and frequent low variability has led to the description of approximately 800 species names available in the literature, of which 250 are likely to be valid.

A molecular study by Dayrat at al. (2011) for the Ellobioidea suggests a monophyletic origin of the entire group.

== Genera ==
Genera within the family Ellobiidae include:

subfamily Ellobiinae

- † Auriculinella Tausch, 1886
- Blauneria Shuttleworth, 1854
- Ellobium Röding, 1798
- † Eoellobium Harzhauser, Pacaud & Landau, 2023
- Leucophytia Winckworth, 1949
- † Palaeoellobium Merle, Néraudeau & Tafforeau, 2025

subfamily Carychiinae

- † Carychiella Strauch, 1977
- † Carychiopsina Kadolsky, 2020
- † Carychiopsis F. Sandberger, 1871
- Carychium O. F. Müller, 1773
- Coilostele W. H. Benson, 1864
- Iberozospeum Jochum, Kneubühler, Prieto & Neubert, 2022
- Koreozospeum Jochum & Prozorova, 2015
- † Ovicarychium Kadolsky, 2020
- † Turricarychium Kadolsky, 2020
- Zospeum Bourguignat, 1856
- † Zuella Kadolsky, 2020

subfamily Melampinae

- Melampus Montfort, 1810
- Tralia J. E. Gray, 1840

subfamily Pedipedinae

- Creedonia Martins, 1996
- Leuconopsis Hutton, 1884
- Marinula King & Broderip, 1832
- Microtralia Dall, 1894
- Pedipes Férussac, 1821
- Pseudomelampus Pallary, 1900
- Sarnia H. Adams & A. Adams, 1855
- † Sulcomarinula Sacco, 1897

subfamily Pythiinae Odhner, 1925

- Allochroa Ancey, 1887
- Auriculastra Martens, 1880
- Cassidula Gray, 1847
- Laemodonta Philippi, 1846
- Myosotella Monterosato, 1906
- Ophicardelus Beck, 1838
- Ovatella Bivona, 1832
- Pleuroloba Hyman, Rouse & Ponder, 2005
- Pythia Röding, 1798 - type genus of the subfamily Pythiinae.

† subfamily Zaptychiinae

- † Zaptychius Walcott, 1883 - type genus of the subfamily

Genera brought into synonymy

- Alexia Leach in Gray, 1847: synonym of Myosotella Monterosato, 1906
- Apodosis Pilsbry & McGinty, 1949 synonym of Leuconopsis F. W. Hutton, 1883 (junior subjective synonym)
- Auricula Lamarck, 1799: synonym of Ellobium Röding, 1798
- Auriculodes Strand, 1928: synonym of Ellobium (Auriculodes) Strand, 1928 represented as Ellobium Röding, 1798
- Auriculus Montfort, 1810 synonym of Ellobium Röding, 1798 (unjustified emendation of Auricula)
- Autonoe Guppy, 1868 synonym of Ellobium (Auriculodes) Strand, 1928 represented as Ellobium Röding, 1798 (junior homonym of Autonoe Leach, 1852 [Bivalvia]; Autonoella Wenz, 1947, is a replacement name)
- Cassidulus Beck, 1838 synonym of Cassidula A. Férussac, 1821 (Invalid: unjustified emendation of Cassidula Férussac, 1821, and also junior homonym of Cassidulus Lamarck, 1801 [Echinodermata])
- Cremnobates Swainson, 1855: synonym of Marinula King & Broderip, 1832
- Cylindrotis Möllendorff, 1895 synonym of Auriculastra E. von Martens, 1880
- Detracia Gray in Turton, 1840: synonym of Melampus (Detracia) Gray, 1840 represented as Melampus Montfort, 1810
- Geovula Swainson, 1840 synonym of Ellobium Röding, 1798 (junior objective synonym)
- Jaminia T. Brown, 1827: synonym of Myosotella Monterosato, 1906
- Kochia Pallary, 1900: synonym of Myosotella Monterosato, 1906
- Laimodonta H. Adams & A. Adams, 1855: synonym of Laemodonta Philippi, 1846
- Leuconia Gray, 1840: synonym of Auriculinella Tausch, 1886
- Leucopepla Peile, 1926: synonym of Auriculinella Tausch, 1886
- Leucophytia Winckworth, 1949: synonym of Auriculinella Tausch, 1886
- Maripythia Iredale, 1936: synonym of Marinula P. P. King, 1832 (unavailable name: no description)
- Melosidula B. J. Smith & Kershaw, 1979: synonym of Cassidula (Cassidula) A. Férussac, 1821 represented as Cassidula A. Férussac, 1821 (junior subjective synonym)
- Monica H. Adams & A. Adams, 1855: synonym of Ovatella Bivona-Bernardi, 1832
- Nealexia Wenz, 1920: synonym of Myosotella Monterosato, 1906
- Phytia: synonym of Pythia Röding, 1798
- Pira H. & A. Adams, 1855: synonym of Melampus Montfort, 1810
- Plecotrema H. Adams & A. Adams, 1854: synonym of Laemodonta Philippi, 1846
- Rangitotoa Powell, 1933: synonym of Microtralia Dall, 1894
- Rhodostoma Swainson, 1840: synonym of Cassidula A. Férussac, 1821 (junior subjective synonym)
- Sidula J. E. Gray, 1840: synonym of Cassidula A. Férussac, 1821 (junior subjective synonym)
- Tifata H. Adams & A. Adams, 1855: synonym of Melampus (Detracia) Gray, 1840 represented as Melampus Montfort, 1810 (junior subjective synonym)
- Volatela Starobogatov, 1993: synonym of Myosotella Monterosato, 1906

Taxonomic note

Genus Sarnia H. Adams & A. Adams, 1855 (temporary name, Sarnia [H. & A. Adams, 1855 (September), The Genera of Recent Mollusca, 2: 239] is an incorrect subsequent spelling of Siona H. Adams & A. Adams, 1855 which is a junior homonym of Siona Duponchel, 1829 [Lepidoptera].)

== Ecology ==
The taxon Ellobioidea comprises a group of morphologically and ecologically highly diverse snails, known to have successfully invaded the marine, brackish water and terrestrial habitats.

These are mostly snails that live in salt marshes and similar maritime habitats, and thus have a tolerance for saline conditions.
