= Subterranean fauna =

Animal species adapted to live in an underground environment

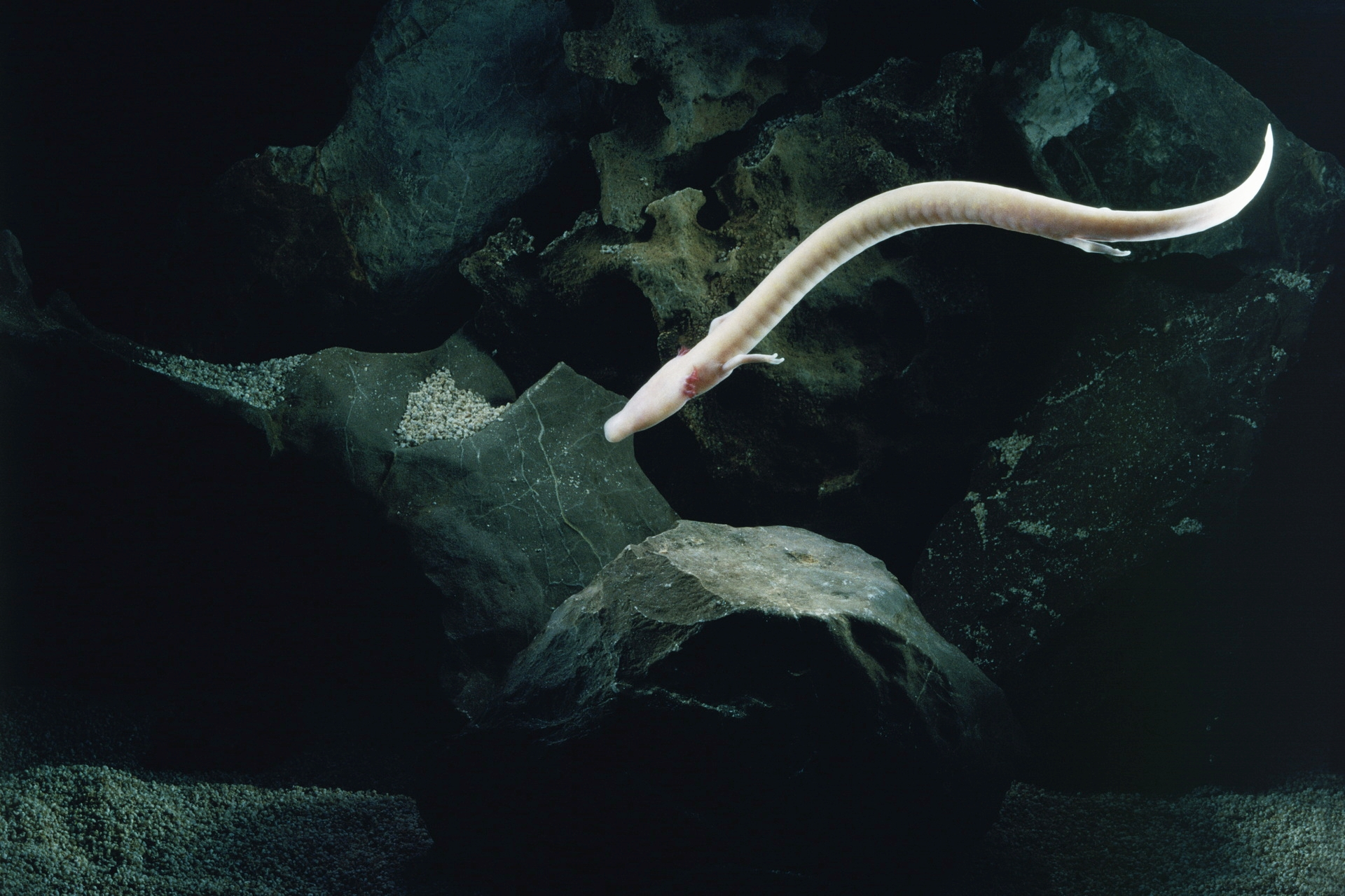
The olm (Proteus anguinus), a typical cave dwelling chordate, endemic of Dinaric Alps

Subterranean fauna refers to animal species that are adapted to live in an underground environment. Troglofauna and stygofauna are the two types of subterranean fauna. Both are associated with hypogeal habitats – troglofauna is associated with terrestrial subterranean environment (caves and underground spaces above the water table), and stygofauna with all kind of subterranean waters (groundwater, aquifers, subterranean rivers, dripping bowls, gours, etc.).

== Environment ==
Subterranean fauna is found worldwide and includes representatives of many animal groups, mostly arthropods and other invertebrates. However, there is a number of vertebrates (such as cavefishes and cave salamanders), although they are less common. Because of the complexity in exploring underground environments, many subterranean species are yet to be discovered and described.

Peculiarities of underground habitat make it an extreme environment and, consequently, underground species are usually less than species living in epigean habitats. The main characteristic of underground environment is the lack of sunlight. Climatic values, like temperature and relative humidity, are generally almost stable – temperature corresponds to annual mean temperature in the place where the cavity opens, relative humidity rarely drops below 90%. Food sources are limited and localized. The lack of sunlight inhibits photosynthetic processes, so food comes only from epigean environment (through percolating water, gravity, or passive transport by animals). An exception are caves like the Movile Cave, where chemosynthesis forms the foundation of the food chain. Caves that are close to the surface, such as lava tubes, often have tree roots hanging from the cave roof, which provide nutrients for sap-feeding insects. Other important food sources in underground habitats are animals being decomposed and bat guano, that creates large invertebrate communities in such caves.

== Ecological classification ==
Cave dwelling animals show different levels of adaptations to underground environment. According to a recent classification, animals living in terrestrial subterranean habitats can be classified into 3 categories, based on their ecology:

- troglobionts (or troglobites): species strongly bound to subterranean habitats;
- troglophiles: species living both in subterranean and in epigean habitats. Troglophiles are also divided in eutroglophiles (epigean species able to maintain a permanent subterranean population) and subtroglophiles (species inclined to perpetually or temporarily inhabit a subterranean habitat, but intimately associated with epigean habitats for some functions);
- trogloxenes: species only occurring sporadically in a hypogean habitat and unable to establish a subterranean population.

Regarding stygofauna, the corresponding words stygobionts (or stygobites), stygophiles and stygoxenes are used.

== Biology ==
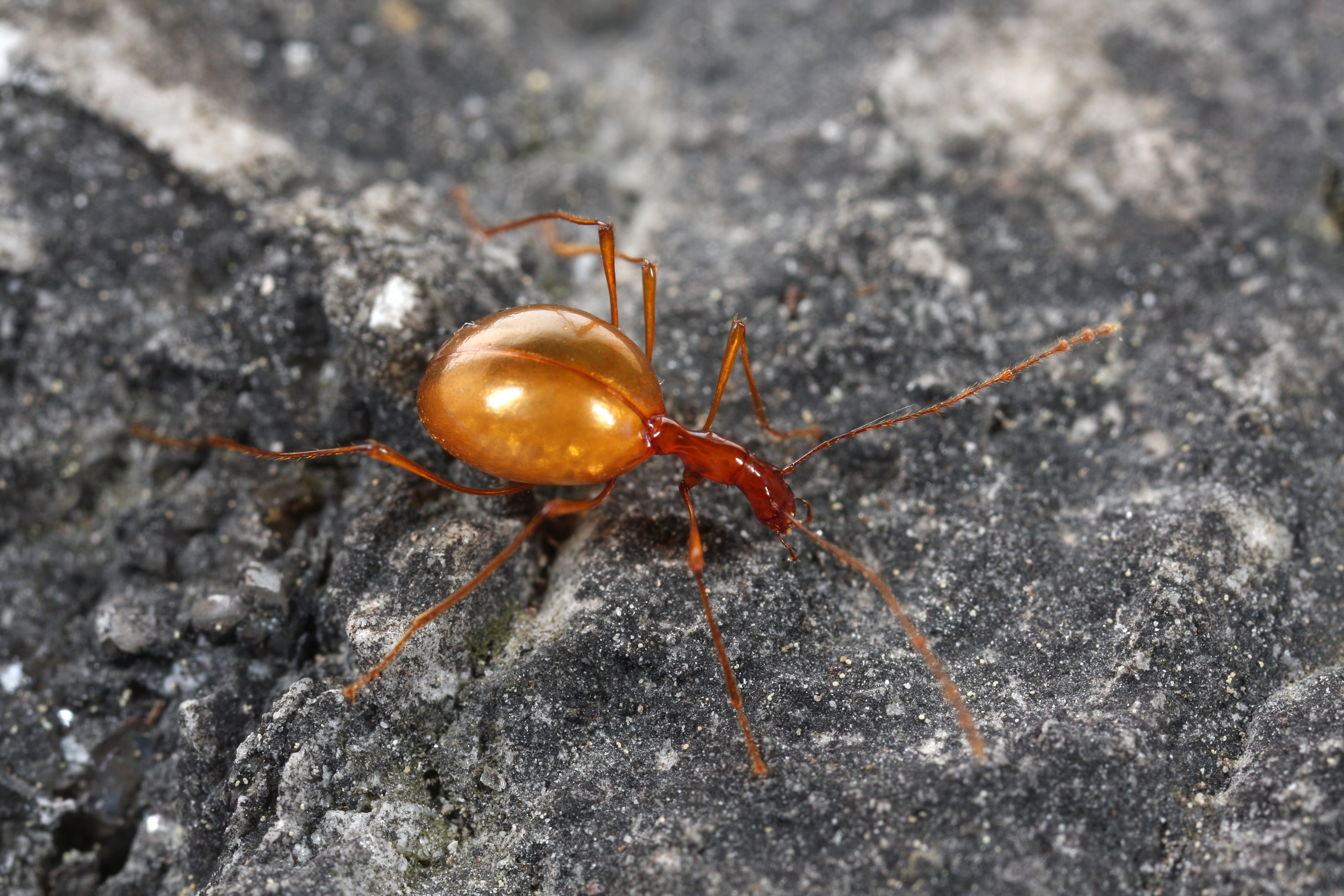
The cave beetle Leptodirus hochenwartii (family Leiodidae)

Characteristics of underground environment caused cave dwelling animals to evolve a number of adaptations, both morphological and physiological. Examples of morphological adaptations include depigmentation (loss of external pigmentation), a reduction of cuticle thickness and the often extreme decrease of eyesight culminating in anophthalmia (complete loss of eyes). Exceptions, however, are harvestmen (Opiliones) in New Zealand caves, which possess large, functional eyes, presumably because these spider-like chelicerates feed on cave-dwelling, light-emitting glowworm larvae Arachnocampa which they detect visually. Other adaptations include the development and elongation of antennal and locomotory appendages, in order to better move around and respond to environmental stimuli. These structures are well endowed with chemical, tactile and humidity receptors (such as Hamann's organ in the cave beetle Leptodirus hochenwartii).

Physiological adaptations include slow metabolism and reduced energy consumption, due to limited food supply and low energy efficiency. This is likely to be realized through reducing movements, erasing aggressive interactions, improving feeding capability and food usage efficiency, and through ectothermy. As a consequence, cave dwelling animals can resist without eating for long time, live more than comparable epigean species, reproduce late in their lifespan, and produce fewer and bigger eggs.

== Evolution and ecology ==
Subterranean fauna have evolved in isolation. Stratigraphic Barriers, such as rock walls and layers, and fluvial barriers, such as rivers and streams, prevent or hinder the dispersal of these animals. Consequently, subterranean fauna habitat and food availability can be very disjunct and precludes the great range of observed diversity across landscapes.

== Threats to subterranean fauna ==
Floodwaters can be detrimental to subterranean species, by dramatically changing the availability of habitat, food and connectivity to other habitats and oxygen. Many subterranean fauna are likely to be sensitive to changes in their environment and floods, which can accompany a drop in temperature, may adversely affect some animals.

Humans also pose a threat to troglofauna. Mismanagement of contaminants (e.g. pesticides and sewage) may poison subterranean fauna communities and removal of habitat (e.g. rising/lowering of the watertable or various forms of mining) can also be a major threat.

== See also ==
- Cave conservation
- List of troglobites
- Speleology
- Subterranean river
- Trogloxene
