= Biospeleology =

Study of organisms that live in caves

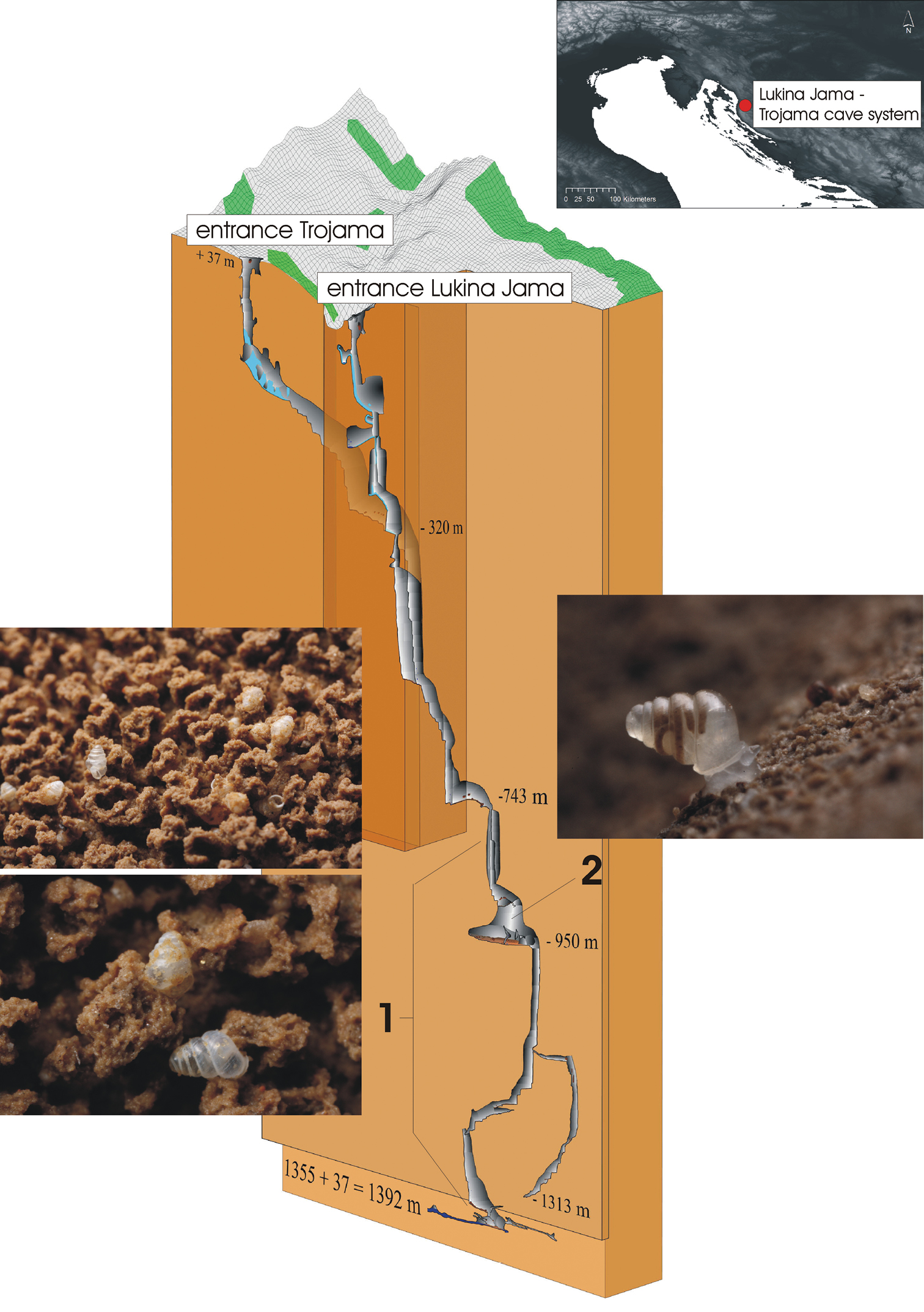
A 3D cross-section of the Lukina jama–Trojama cave system in the Velebit mountains of Croatia. The collection sites (1) of the shells and the single living specimen (2) of the cave-dwelling snail Zospeum tholussum are indicated.

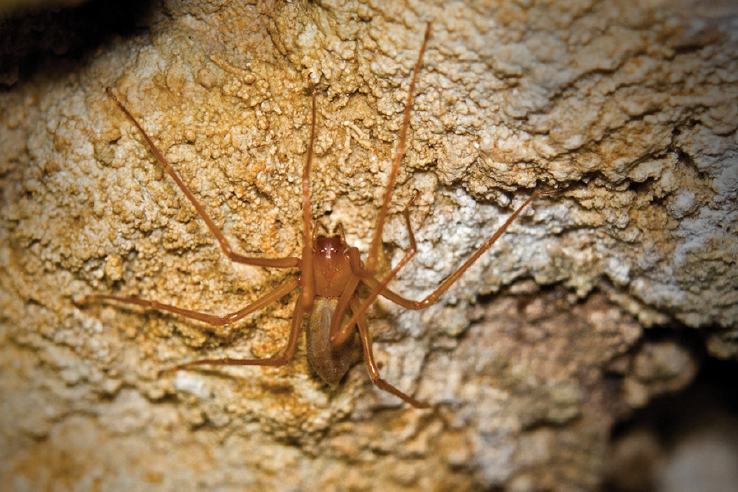
The spider Trogloraptor marchingtoni from a cave in Oregon.

Biospeleology, also known as cave biology, is a branch of biology dedicated to the study of organisms that live in caves and are collectively referred to as troglofauna.

== Biospeleology as a science ==
=== History ===
The first documented mention of a cave organism dates back to 1689, with the documentation of the olm, a cave salamander. Discovered in a cave in Slovenia, in the region of Carniola, it was mistaken for a baby dragon and was recorded by Johann Weikhard von Valvasor in his work The Glory of the Duchy of Carniola. The first formal study on cave organisms was conducted on the blind cave beetle. Found in 1831 by Luka Čeč, an assistant to the lamplighter, when exploring the newly discovered inner portions of the Postojna cave system in southwestern Slovenia. The specimen was turned over to Ferdinand J. Schmidt, who described it in the paper Illyrisches Blatt (1832). He named it Leptodirus Hochenwartii after the donor, and also gave it the Slovene name drobnovratnik and the German name Enghalskäfer, both meaning "slender-necked (beetle)". The article represents the first formal description of a cave animal (the olm, described in 1768, wasn't recognized as a cave animal at the time). Subsequent research by Schmidt revealed further previously unknown cave inhabitants, which aroused considerable interest among natural historians. For this reason, the discovery of L. hochenwartii (along with the olm) is considered as the starting point of biospeleology as a scientific discipline. Biospeleology was formalized as a science in 1907 by Emil Racoviță with his seminal work Essai sur les problèmes biospéologiques ("Essay on biospeleological problems”).

The first work on the systematisation of biospeleology however was the Catalogus Cavernarum Animalium (1934) by Hungarian biologist Endre Dudich and German-Jewish biologist Benno Wolf, which is also the first animal catalogue in history. Among other discoveries Dudich is also responsible for the discovery of around 220 cavedwelling species, realized that caves are not cohesive biotopes and he was the first to classify cave ecosystems into groups:

- Exotrophic caves
- Photo-endotrophic caves
- Chemo-endotrophic caves
- Photo-chemo-endotrophic caves

In 1930, he and his Hungarian co-researchers also disproved the then prominent theory that cave-dwelling creatures are subject to constant starvation.

=== Subdivisions ===
==== Organisms Categories ====
Cave organisms fall into three basic classes:

===== Troglobite =====
Troglobites are obligatory cavernicoles, specialized for cave life. Some can leave caves for short periods, and may complete parts of their life cycles above ground, but cannot live their entire lives outside of a cave environment. Examples include chemotrophic bacteria, some species of flatworms, springtails, and cavefish.

===== Troglophile =====
Troglophiles can live part or all of their lives in caves, but can also complete a life cycle in appropriate environments on the surface. Examples include cave crickets, bats, millipedes, pseudoscorpions and spiders.

===== Trogloxene =====
Trogloxenes frequent caves, and may require caves for a portion of its life cycle, but must return to the surface (or a parahypogean zone) for at least some portion of its life. Oilbirds and most Daddy longlegs are trogloxenes.

==== Environmental Categories ====
Cave environments fall into three general categories:

===== Endogean =====
Endogean environments are the parts of caves that are in communication with surface soils through cracks and rock seams, groundwater seepage, and root protrusion.

===== Parahypogean =====
Parahypogean environments are the threshold regions near cave mouths that extend to the last penetration of sunlight.

===== Hypogean =====
Hypogean or "true" cave environments. These can be in regular contact with the surface via wind and underground rivers, or the migration of animals, or can be almost entirely isolated. Deep hypogean environments can host autonomous ecologies whose primary source of energy is not sunlight, but chemical energy liberated from limestone and other minerals by chemoautotrophic bacteria.

== Notable biospeleologists ==
- Emil Racoviță, co-founder of biospeleology, the first Romanian to go to the arctic, collected the type specimens of the flightless midge Belgica antarctica
- Carl Eigenmann, is credited with identifying and describing for the first time 195 genera containing nearly 600 species of fishes of North America and South America
- Louis Fage, was a founding member of the Commission de spéléologie
- René Jeannel, co-founder of biospeleology
- Curt Kosswig, is known as the Father of Turkish Zoology.
- Boris Sket, Approximately 35 animal species are named sketi, and three genera.
- Endre Dudich, founder and committee member of the Hungarian Speleological Society in 1926.
- Karel Absolon, though more famous for his archaeological and speleological discoveries, Absolon started his career out as a biospeleologist.

== Bibliography ==
- Bernard Collignon, Caving, scientific approaches., Edisud 1988
- Fabien Steak, Approach biospéologie, File EFS Instruction No. 116, 1st Edition, 1997
- C. Delamare-Debouteville, Life in caves, PUF, Que sais-je?, Paris 1971
- Bernard Gèze, Scientific caving, Seuil, Paris, 1965, p. 137-167
- R. and V. Decou Ginet, Introduction to biology and groundwater ecology, University Publishing Delarge 1977
- René Jeannel, Animal cave in France, Lechevalier, Paris, 1926
- René Jeannel, Living fossils caves, Gallimard, Paris, 1943
- Edward Alfred Martel, Groundwater evolution, Flammarion, Paris, 1908, p. 242-289
- Georges Émile Racovitza, Essay on biospéologiques problems, I Biospeologica 1907
- Michel Siffre, Animals sinkholes and caves, Hachette, 1979
- Michel Siffre, France The caves and caverns, ed. Privat, 1999, p. 136-153
- G. and R. Thines Tercafs, Atlas of the underground life: the cave animals, Boubée (Paris) and De Visscher (Brussels), 1972
- Albert Vandel Biospéologie: the biology of cave animals, Gauthier-Villars, Paris, 1964
- Armand Vire, The subterranean fauna of France, Paris, 1900
