= Zospeum bucculentum =

Scientific classification
- Kingdom: Animalia
- Phylum: Mollusca
- Class: Gastropoda
- Order: Ellobiida
- Family: Ellobiidae
- Genus: Zospeum
- Species: Z. bucculentum

Binomial name
- Zospeum bucculentum Inäbnit, Jochum & Neubert, 2019

Species of gastropod

Zospeum bucculentum is a cave-dwelling species of air-breathing land snails (Eupulmonata, Ellobioidea, Carychiinae).

== Taxonomy ==
The species was established based on specimens that previously were classified as Z. isselianum or Z. likanum. This species is named after its large aperture (lat.: bucculentus: having a large mouth).

== Description ==
The species has a shell height of 1.8 mm and a shell width of 1.2 mm. The shell is greatly variable, taller and slenderer than those of its relatives. It is smooth, transparent and has a conic shape with approximately 5 slightly shouldered whorls, sometimes with an obtuse keel. The opening (aperture) is taller than wide, visible in the shells of the northernmost cave (Pivnica špilja), but hardly pronounced in shells from its other known locality, Jama na Škrilama. The peristome is roundish to oval, with a straight or rounded parietal shield, which is well-differentiated from the lip. The parientalis is present in the opening with varying prominence. The shell has a parietalis and a weak columellaris. The columellaris is completely absent in some of the examined individuals.

== Distribution ==
This species is endemic to the northwestern part of the Karlovac region in Croatia. Genetic records are from three caves: Pivnica špilja, Jama na Škrilama and Vrelić špilja. Additionally, specimens were discovered in Zvonečka II and Jama Đot, which are considered to belong to Zospeum bucculentum based on shell morphology.
