= Horologion speokoites =

Conservation status
- Possibly Extinct (NatureServe)

Scientific classification
- Kingdom: Animalia
- Phylum: Arthropoda
- Clade: Pancrustacea
- Class: Insecta
- Order: Coleoptera
- Suborder: Adephaga
- Family: Carabidae
- Genus: Horologion
- Species: H. speokoites

Binomial name
- Horologion speokoites Valentine, 1932

Synonyms
- Horologion speokites (misspelling)

Species of beetle

Horologion speokoites, the Arbuckle Cave ground beetle, is a trechine beetle known from a single specimen collected from a cave in West Virginia.

== Description and habitat ==
The Arbuckle Cave ground beetle was described in 1932 by the entomologist Joseph Manson Valentine based on a specimen collected from Arbuckle Cave near Lewisburg, West Virginia.

The described specimen was found in the muddy lower level of the cave and was initially assumed to be a cave-dwelling species; per Valentine the species name speokoites is derived from a Greek word meaning "lodges in a cave." The discovery of a second Horologion species has since called this into question; multiple specimens of the second species, H. hubbardi, mainly deceased, were discovered near dripstone pools in a cave in Virginia, leading the discovers to speculate that Horologion beetles do not live in caves but in the overlying epikarst, and are inadvertently washed down into caves as water drains through the karst.

== Morphology ==
The Arbuckle cave beetle has a hourglass-shaped body and short legs. It is reddish-brown with yellow-brown legs and pale yellow antennae and labial palpi. The only known specimen, a male, measured 3.45 mm long from the elytral apex to the tip of the mandibles.

== Status ==
The Arbuckle cave beetle has not been documented since 1931 despite multiple subsequent insect-collecting expeditions to Arbuckle cave and may be extinct. Conversely, if it is not a true cave-dweller and in fact inhabits the overlying epikarst, its apparent rarity might be explained by the inaccessibility of its habitat to researchers.
