= Parvotettix =

Scientific classification
- Kingdom: Animalia
- Phylum: Arthropoda
- Clade: Pancrustacea
- Class: Insecta
- Order: Orthoptera
- Suborder: Ensifera
- Family: Rhaphidophoridae
- Subfamily: Macropathinae
- Tribe: Macropathini
- Genus: Parvotettix; Richards, 1968

Genus of cave cricket endemic to Tasmania, Australia

Parvotettix is an extant genus of cave cricket from the order Orthoptera in the family Rhaphidophoridae, endemic to Tasmania, Australia. The genus was established in 1968 by Aola Richards and contains six species she described. Parvotettix is a sister group to the subfamily Macropathinae, forming a paraphyletic Australian grouping.

== Habitat ==
Parvotettix occupy epigean, subterranean habitats. Parvotettix were initially discovered in limestone caves. Various species within the genus Parvotettix inhabit environmental structures such as mine adits, large rock crevices, tree logs, caves, burrows created by other animals and within houses. Parvotettix thrive in dark, moist environments in colder temperatures at sea level.

There is no threatening conservation risk associated with Parvotettix. Environmental factors that increase vulnerability for Parvotettix include predation by rodents that are introduced to the area, interspecific competition, climate change impacts and illegal capture by humans.

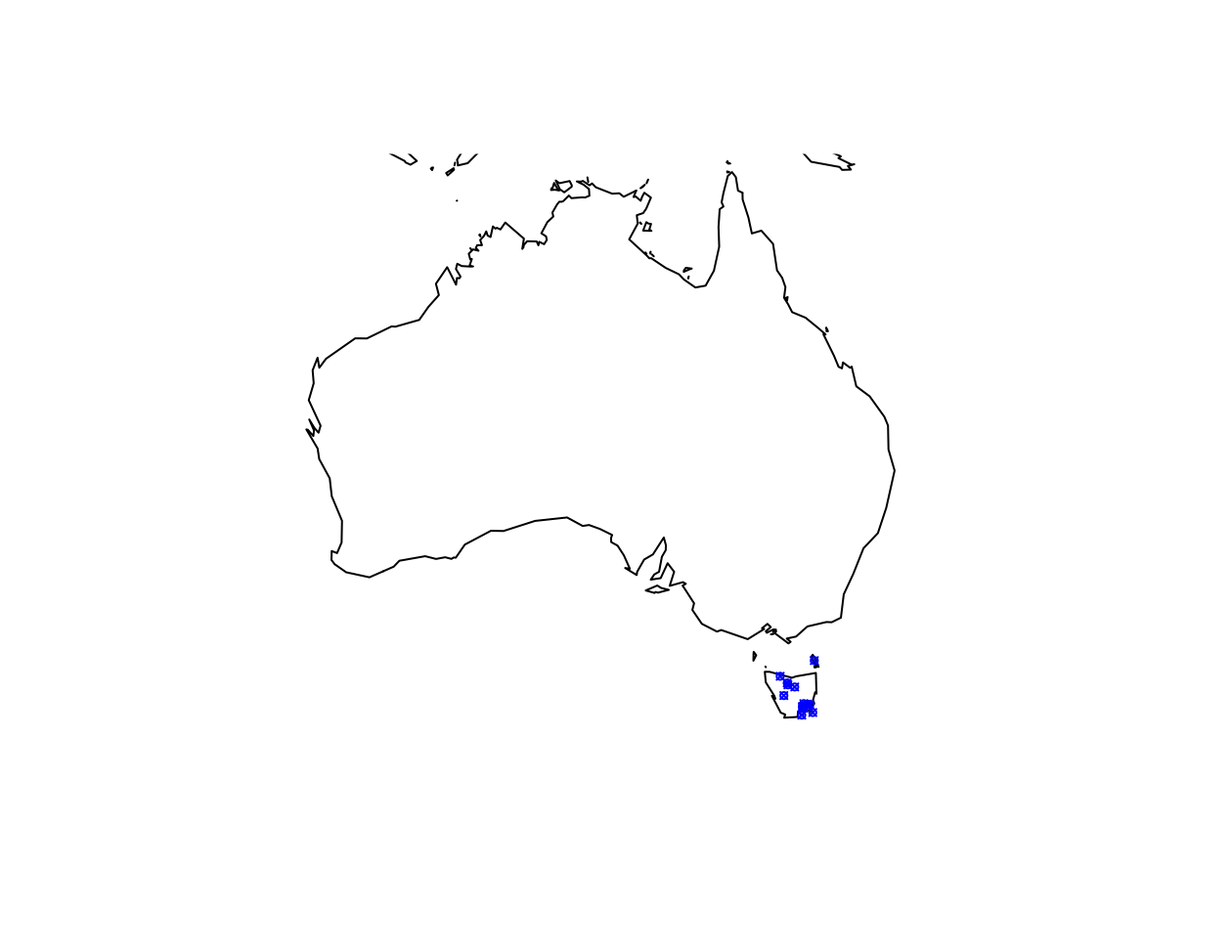
Geographic distribution of members of the genus Parvotettix, in Tasmania, Australia. Data was retrieved from inaturalist sightings of Parvotettix.

== Geographical origin ==
The lineage Parvotettix is sister to all cave cricket species in the Southern Hemisphere, suggesting dispersal from Tasmania around the globe. None of the Macropathinae have wings so their distribution has been suggested to date to Gondwana breakup. The six species of Parvotettix are not closely related to other Australian genera in Tasmania (e.g. Micropathus) or genera in south-eastern mainland (e.g. Novotettix). The dispersal of Parvotettix from or to Tasmania may have been facilitated by a land bridge which connected the areas of Wilson's Promontory, Victoria and Flinders Island, Tasmania in the Pleistocene period until approximately 10,000 to 15,000 years ago. Species of Parvotettix have been observed on Cape Barren Island and Flinders Island. Relationships among the six Parvotettix species might be explained by geographic isolation and connection as during the Pleistocene era the Furneaux Islands and north-eastern Tasmania were joint together, and 1,500 years after the linkage between Wilson's Promontory and Flinders Island, a land bridge formed joining Flinders Island and Tasmania.

== Morphology ==
Parvotettix are wingless, have short setae covering the body surface, long thin legs with apical spines and long antennae that narrows near the tip. Parvotettix have a segmented body where from segment four, the length of each segment is approximately the same whilst segments become reduced in size. Maxillary palps with the third and fourth segments being of approximate length to each other. They also possess coxa and a spine.

== Species ==
- Parvotettix domesticus Richards, 1970
- Parvotettix fortescuensis Richards (fontescuensis Otte, 2000)
- Parvotettix goedei Richards, 1968
- Parvotettix maydenaensis Richards, 1971
- Parvotettix rangaensis Richards, 1970
- Parvotettix whinrayi Richards, 1974
