= Cave living =

Cave living may refer to:

- Human cave dwellers
- Troglobites and Trogloxenes, cave-dwelling animals
- Underground living in caves

== See also ==
- Caving
- Cave diving
- Cave painting
