= Zospeum robustum =

Scientific classification
- Kingdom: Animalia
- Phylum: Mollusca
- Class: Gastropoda
- Order: Ellobiida
- Family: Ellobiidae
- Genus: Zospeum
- Species: Z. robustum

Binomial name
- Zospeum robustum Inäbnit, Jochum & Neubert, 2019

Species of gastropod

Zospeum robustum is a cave-dwelling species of air-breathing land snails (Eupulmonata, Ellobioidea, Carychiinae).

== Taxonomy ==
The species was established based on specimens that previously were classified as Z. obesum, Z. isselianum or Z. frauenfeldii. It is named after the solid, robust shell of the holotype (lat.: robustum: robust).

== Description ==
Zospeum robustum has an average shell height of ca. 1.6 mm and an average shell width of ca. 1.1 mm. The shell is transparent and has an ovate-conical shape, showing a high variability in shape. It is either smooth or ribbed, sometimes at the uppermost part of the whorl or the entire whorl. The shell possesses between 4.75 and 6 whorls, whereby the last whorl is sometimes expanded. The opening (aperture) is taller than wide. The peristome is roundish, sometimes quite massive, in most cases with a small, straight parietal shield. The shell has a parietalis and a weak columellaris. The columellaris is completely absent in those populations with ribbed shells.

== Distribution ==
Zospeum robustum occurs in Croatia in three separate areas:

1) In the caves Budina špilja and Markov ponor in the Lika-Senj county, as well as in Ostrvička špilja and the upper part of the Lukina jama-Trojama cave system.

2) In the caves Tonkovića špilja and Špilja pod Mačkovom dragom in the north of Ogulin.

3) In three caves in and around the Žumberak Mountains: Vrlovka, Pušina jama and Židovske kuće.
