= Koreozospeum =

Scientific classification
- Kingdom: Animalia
- Phylum: Mollusca
- Class: Gastropoda
- Order: Ellobiida
- Family: Ellobiidae
- Genus: Koreozospeum
- Species: K. nodongense

Binomial name
- Koreozospeum nodongense Lee, Prozorova & Jochum, 2015

Genus of gastropods

Koreozospeum is a genus of small air-breathing land snails (Eupulmonata, Ellobioidea, Carychiinae). It contains a single species, Koreozospeum nodongense.

== Etymology ==
The name of Koreozospeum derives from Korea, where this genus was first found. The second part of the name refers to its similarity to the European subterranean carychiid genus Zospeum.

== Description ==
Koreozospeum has a thin, squat ovate-conic shell, which shows fine spiral rows of interconnected pits constant throughout the teleoconch. The peristome has an oblique, ear-shaped (auriform) form. The shell shows a conspicuously pleated lip folded back onto the body whorl. Koreozospeum has an interrupted lamellar ridge on the next to last whorl, which then develops a uniformly shaped annular lamella.

== Distribution and habitat ==
This species is only known from the type locality, Nodong cave in Danyang County in the North Chungcheong Province in South Korea, where the shells were collected in 2000 at an altitude of ca. 271 m. Individuals occur on moist muddy walls in the cave.

== Conservation ==
The caves in Danyang County are majorly threatened due to large cement factories located in the region. In addition, the caves of Nodong, Gosu and Cheondong are popular tourist attractions. The frequent human traffic is an immediate threat for the species. Currently, Koreozospeum nodongense is known to inhabit only one locality and this area is declining due to human encroachment.
