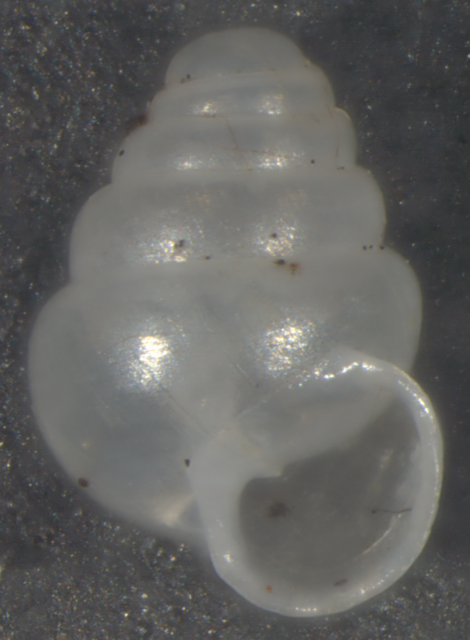

Scientific classification
- Kingdom: Animalia
- Phylum: Mollusca
- Class: Gastropoda
- Order: Ellobiida
- Family: Ellobiidae
- Genus: Zospeum
- Species: Z. manitaense

Binomial name
- Zospeum manitaense Inäbnit, Jochum et Neubert, 2019

= Zospeum manitaense =

Species of gastropod

Zospeum manitaense is a cave-dwelling species of air-breathing land snail. Some individuals in this genus were previously described under the name of Zospeum amoenum, Zospeum isselianum or Zospeum pretneri.

== Description ==
The species has a shell height of about 1.309 mm and a shell width of 0.86–1.02 mm. Compared to its relatives the shell is broader and has a blunt tip. It is transparent, smooth and has a conical shape with 4.75–5.25 whorls and a deep suture. The peristome is roundish. The parietal wall (parietalis) is weak or totally absent in the opening (aperture). A lamella on the columella (columellaris) is lacking. The parietal shield is well defined with a straight margin and is well differentiated from the rest of the lip. The central column of the shell (columella) shows a parietalis.

== Taxonomy ==
The species is named after the Croatian type locality, cave Manita peć, located in Paklenica National Park.

== Distribution ==
This species from Croatia was reported from one or two caves within Paklenica National Park and from one cave on the Crnopac Mountain.
