= Stygofauna =

Animals living in subterranean waters

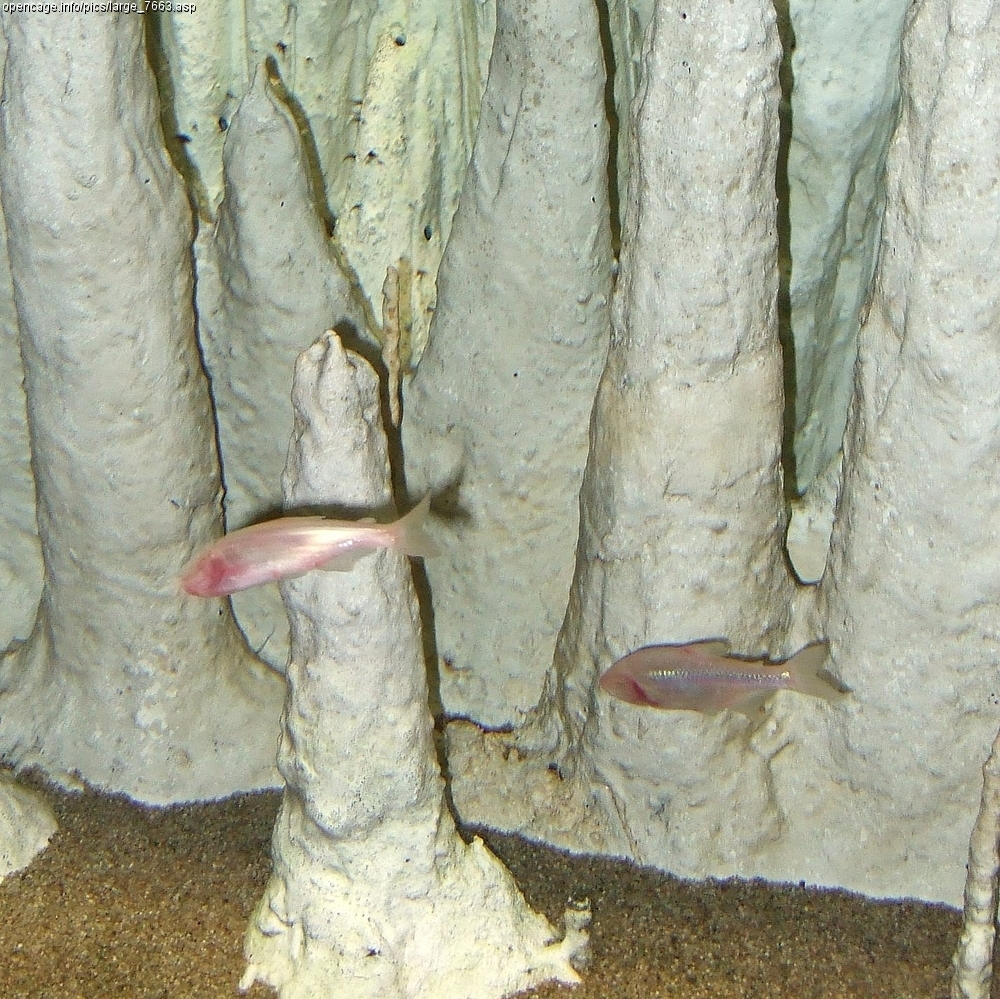
Astyanax jordani, a cavefish from Mexican caves

Stygofauna, or stygobionts (meaning "of the river Styx") are any fauna that live in groundwater systems or aquifers, such as caves, fissures, and vugs. Stygofauna and troglofauna are the two types of subterranean fauna (based on life-history). Both are associated with subterranean environments – stygofauna are associated with water, and troglofauna with caves and spaces above the water table. Stygofauna can live within freshwater aquifers and within the pore spaces of limestone, calcrete or laterite, whilst larger animals can be found in cave waters and wells. Stygofaunal animals, like troglofauna, are divided into 3 groups based on their life history – stygophiles, stygoxenes, and stygobites.

1. Stygophiles inhabit both surface and subterranean aquatic environments, but are not necessarily restricted to either.
2. Stygoxenes are like stygophiles, except they are defined as accidental or occasional presence in subterranean waters. Stygophiles and stygoxenes may live for part of their lives in caves, but don't complete their life cycle in them.
3. Stygobites are obligate, or strictly subterranean, aquatic animals and complete their entire life in this environment.

Extensive research of stygofauna has been undertaken in countries with ready access to caves and wells such as France, Slovenia, the US and, more recently, Australia. Many species of stygofauna, particularly obligate stygobites, are endemic to specific regions or even individual caves. This makes them an important focus for the conservation of groundwater systems.

== Diet and lifecycle ==
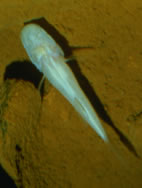
The Alabama cavefish (Speoplatyrhinus poulsoni)

Stygofauna have adapted to the limited food supply and are extremely energy efficient. Stygofauna feed on plankton, bacteria, and plants found in streams.

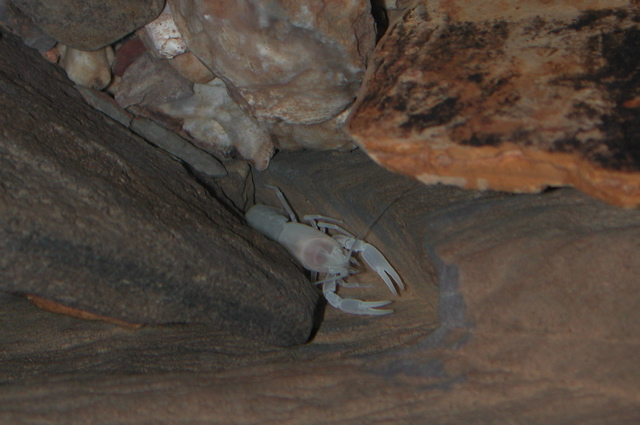
Orconectes australis, a cave crayfish

To survive in an environment where food is scarce and oxygen levels are low, stygofauna often have very low metabolism. As a result, stygofauna may live longer than other terrestrial species. For example, the crayfish Orconectes australis from Shelta Cave in Alabama has been estimated to reproduce at 100 years and live to 175 although more recent research suggests their lifespan is closer to 22 years.

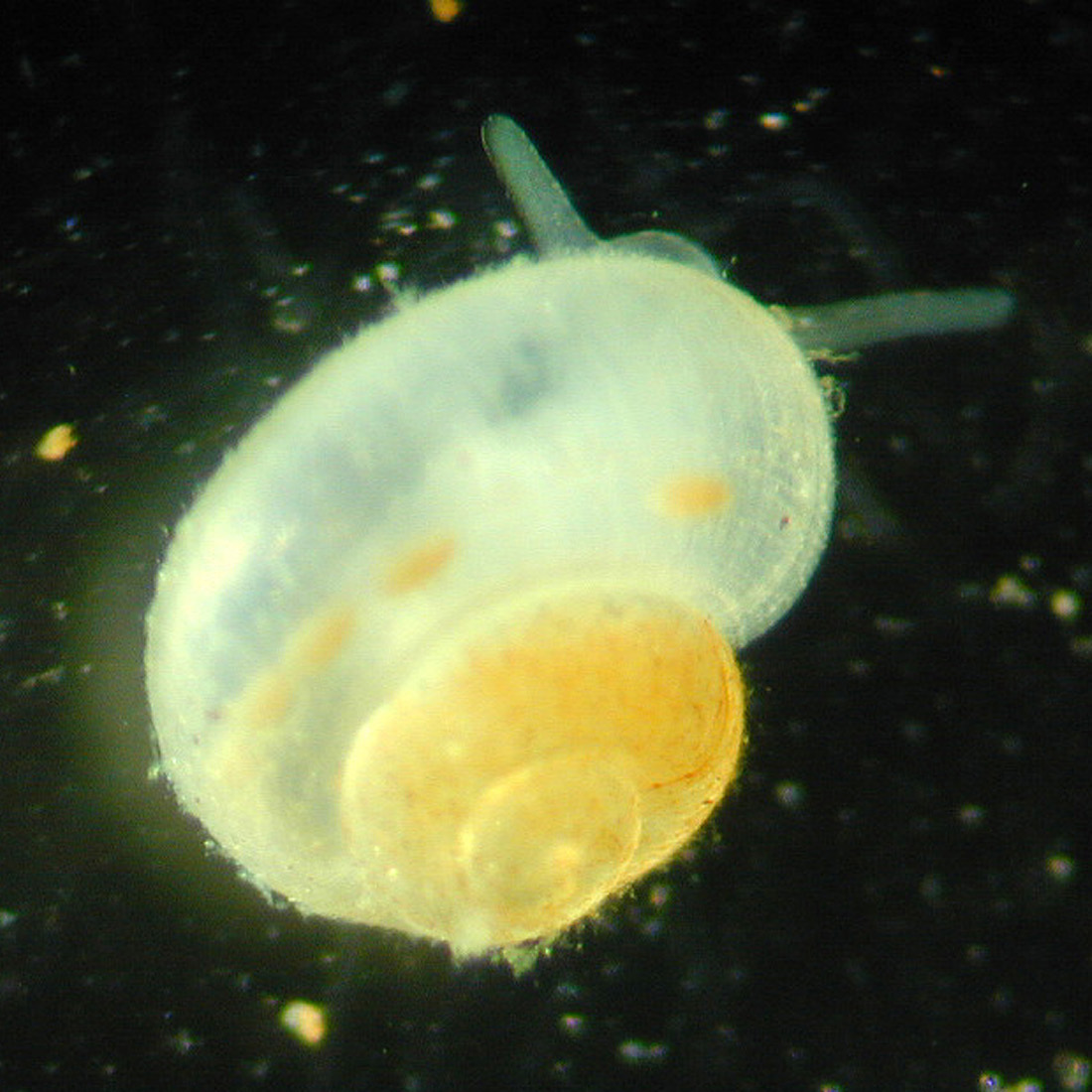
The Tumbling Creek cavesnail (Antrobia culveri) is a typical stygobite: small, white and blind.

== Distribution and species ==
Stygofauna are found all over the world and include turbellarians, gastropods, isopods, amphipods, decapods, fishes, or salamanders.

Stygofaunal gastropods are found in the U.S., Europe, Japan, and Australia. Stygobite turbellarians can be found in North America, Europe, and Japan. Stygobite isopods, amphipods, and decapods are found widely around the world.

Cave salamanders are found in Europe and the U.S., but only some of these (such as the olm and Texas blind salamander) are entirely aquatic.

The approximately 170 species of stygobite fish, popularly known as cavefish, are found in all continents except Antarctica, but with major geographical differences in the species richness.

== Collecting stygofauna ==
Several methods are currently used to sample stygofauna. The accepted method is to lower a haul net, which is a weighted plankton net (with minimum 50 μm mesh size), to the bottom of the bore, well or sinkhole and jiggled to agitate sediments at the base of the bore. The net is then slowly retrieved, filtering stygofauna out of the water column on the upward haul. A more destructive method is to pump bore water (using a Bou-Rouch pump) through a net on the surface (referred to as the Karaman-Chappuis method). These two methods provide animals for morphological and molecular analyses. A video camera can also be used down the hole, providing information on life-history of the organisms but given the small size of the animals, no species determinations can be made.

== See also ==
- Cave conservation – Protection of caves to minimise the effects of human activities
- List of troglobites – Animals that live underground
- Speleology – Science of cave and karst systems
- Subterranean fauna – Animal species adapted to live in an underground environment
- Trogloxene – Animals which inhabit caves periodically or accidentally
