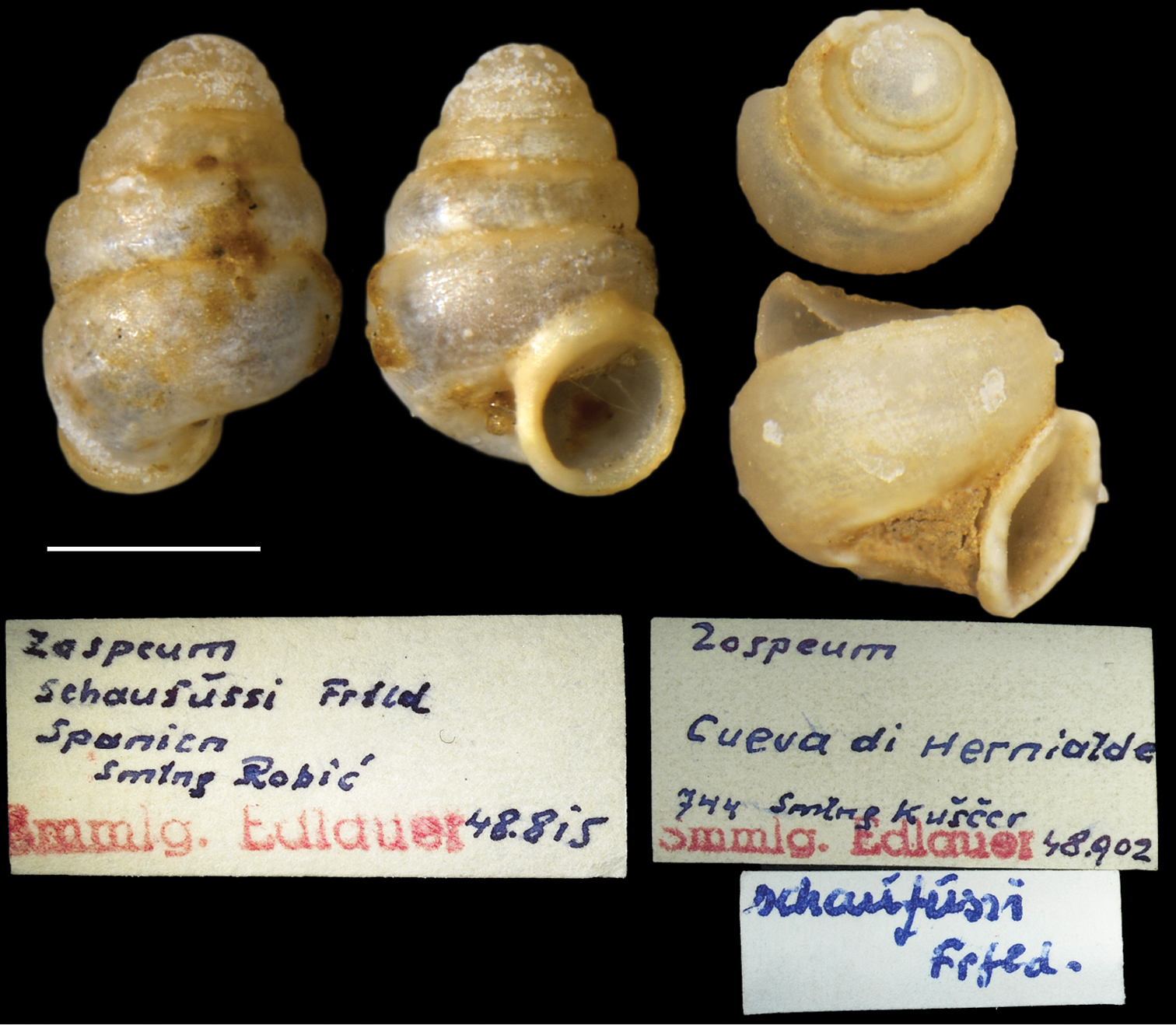

Scientific classification
- Domain: Eukaryota
- Kingdom: Animalia
- Phylum: Mollusca
- Class: Gastropoda
- Order: Ellobiida
- Family: Ellobiidae
- Genus: Zospeum
- Species: Z. vasconicum

Binomial name
- Zospeum vasconicum Prieto, De Winter, Weigand, Gomez & Jochum, 2015

= Zospeum vasconicum =

Species of gastropod

Zospeum vasconicum is a cave-dwelling species of air-breathing land snails (Eupulmonata, Ellobioidea, Carychiinae).

== Description ==
It is a very small species with a variable shell height (on average ca. 1.2 mm) and an average shell width of 0.80 – 0.87 mm. The shell is transparent and has an elongate or elongate-conical shape with an entire, roundish and more or less thickened peristome. The peristome is closely adhering to the spire, reflected and takes up ca. 40% of the shell height. The shell has about five convex, regularly coiled whorls, which are more or less strongly shouldered, especially in the more conical shells. The shell shows a deep suture. The opening (aperture) is more or less of a circular shape. This species lacks obvious apertural barriers, but often an obsolete lamella (denticle) in the parieto-columellar corner can be seen. The central column of the shell (columella) possesses a single, low annular lamella.

== Distribution ==
Zospeum vasconicum shells were collected by various workers from caves in the Sierra de Aitzgorri and the adjacent Sierra de Aramotz-Anboto in the Provinces of Gipuzkoa and Bizkaia in Northern Spain. Live individuals were encountered in the Cueva Arrikrutz. Populations of Zospeum vasconicum were found in the Cueva de la Ermita de Sandaili (at an altitude of 400 m), the Cueva de Otxas (at an altitude of 500 m), the Cueva Silibranka-2 (at an altitude of 220 m) and the Cueva del Cranéo (at an altitude of 400 m).

== Etymology ==
The species Zospeum vasconicum is named after the pre-Roman Era Vascones Tribe (from Latin gens Vasconum), which at the arrival of the Romans during the 1st century, inhabited a territory spanning the region between the upper course of the Ebro River and the southern basin of the western Pyrenees.

== Ecology ==
Zospeum vasconicum were discovered on moist, muddy walls in karst caves at a maximum depth of 400m. They were identified on densely perforated mats of fine mud lining the walls of the upper level of the cave. Near this population, translucent Zospeum shells were found embedded in a thick, uniform layer of mud, superficially interspersed with yellow, clumped strands of fungal aggregations.

== Conservation ==
Jochum et al. (2015) suggest that the species is not immediately threatened. They found fresh empty shells in relative abundance at various spots in the caves, where Zospsum vasconicum occur. On a global scale the distribution is likely limited to less than 5 caves within a radius of less than 20 km^{2}.
