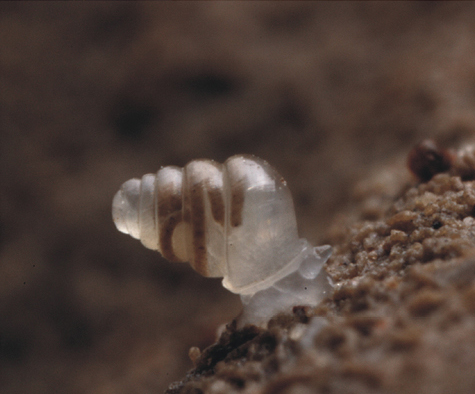
- The shells of living specimens of Zospeum tholussum are translucent
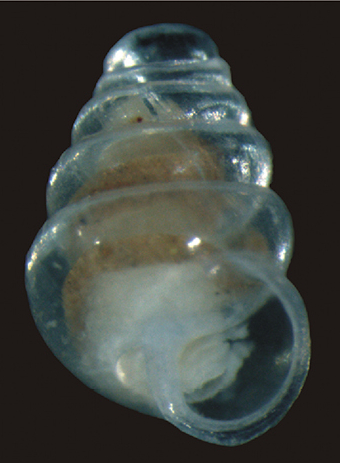

Conservation status
- Near Threatened (IUCN 3.1)

Scientific classification
- Kingdom: Animalia
- Phylum: Mollusca
- Class: Gastropoda
- Order: Ellobiida
- Family: Ellobiidae
- Genus: Zospeum
- Species: Z. tholussum

Binomial name
- Zospeum tholussum Weigand, 2013

= Zospeum tholussum =

Species of gastropod

Zospeum tholussum or the domed land snail, is a cave-dwelling species of air-breathing land snails in the family Ellobiidae. It is a very small species, with a shell height of less than 2 mm (0.08 in) and a shell width of around 1 mm (0.04 in). Z. tholussum individuals are completely blind and possess translucent shells with five to six whorls. The second whorl of their shells has a characteristic dome-like shape. They are also extremely slow-moving and may depend on passive transportation through running water or larger animals for dispersal.

Zospeum tholussum was discovered at depths of 743 to 1,392 m (2,438 to 4,567 ft) in the Lukina jama–Trojama cave system in Croatia in 2012, during a caving expedition. It was formally described as a new species in 2013 by the taxonomist Dr. Alexander M. Weigand.

On 22 May 2014 International Institute for Species Exploration declared the snail as one of the "Top 10 New Species of 2014" among species discovered in 2013. The reason for its selection is its habitat in complete darkness of a cave some 900 meters below the surface. It lacks eyes and its shell is transparent giving it a ghost-like appearance.

== Discovery ==
Specimens of Zospeum tholussum were recovered by a team of cavers and biologists of the Croatian Biospeleological Society (Hrvatsko Biospeleološko Društvo or HBSD) from the Lukina jama–Trojama cave system in the Velebit mountains of Croatia, during an expedition from July 29 to August 8, 2012. The cave system is the deepest in Croatia and one of the top twenty deepest caves in the world at a total measured depth of 1,421 m (4,662 ft), including submerged passages. Aside from its great depth, the cave system is also known for its vertical orientation and deep shafts.

The expedition was primarily to determine the cave system's depth, but the team also collected specimens of animals they encountered. The cave system has two entrances, the Lukina jama and the Trojama caves (jama means "pit" in Croatian). Lukina jama is situated about 37 m (121 ft) lower on the mountain slopes than Trojama. It was named after the caver Ozren Lukic, who was killed in the Velebit mountains while serving as a Croatian soldier in the Croatian War of Independence. Lukina jama and Trojama are connected to each other underground at a depth of 558 m (1,831 ft) from the entrance of Lukina jama (595 m (1,952 ft) if measured from the entrance of Trojama). The cave system is unusual for containing three different microclimatic layers which makes it extremely interesting in terms of biodiversity to scientists. The first 200 m (660 ft) of the cave system's entrance is permanently covered in thick layers of snow and ice and has an average air temperature of 1 °C (34 °F). The cave system progressively becomes warmer in deeper areas, with an average air temperature of 2 °C (36 °F) in the middle part and 4 °C (39 °F) at the bottom.

Empty shells of Zospeum tholussum were encountered by the team beginning at a depth of 743 m (2,438 ft) and down to the lake at the bottom of the cave, which is about 1,392 m (4,567 ft) beneath the Trojama cave entrance. The shells were usually found embedded in layers of mud, with an appearance described as a "grazing-labyrinth-like" structure. The team collected eight empty shells over a period of several days. They also recovered a single live specimen of Zospeum tholussum from an unnamed large chamber at a depth of about 980 m (3,220 ft). The chamber was about 65 m (213 ft) long and 70 m (230 ft) wide. The chamber substrate was composed mainly of rocks and sand. A small temporal stream was also present near the area. The air temperature in the chamber was about 3.3 to 3.5 °C (37.9 to 38.3 °F) with an air humidity of 100%. The water temperature of the stream was about 5.1 °C (41.2 °F).

== Taxonomy ==
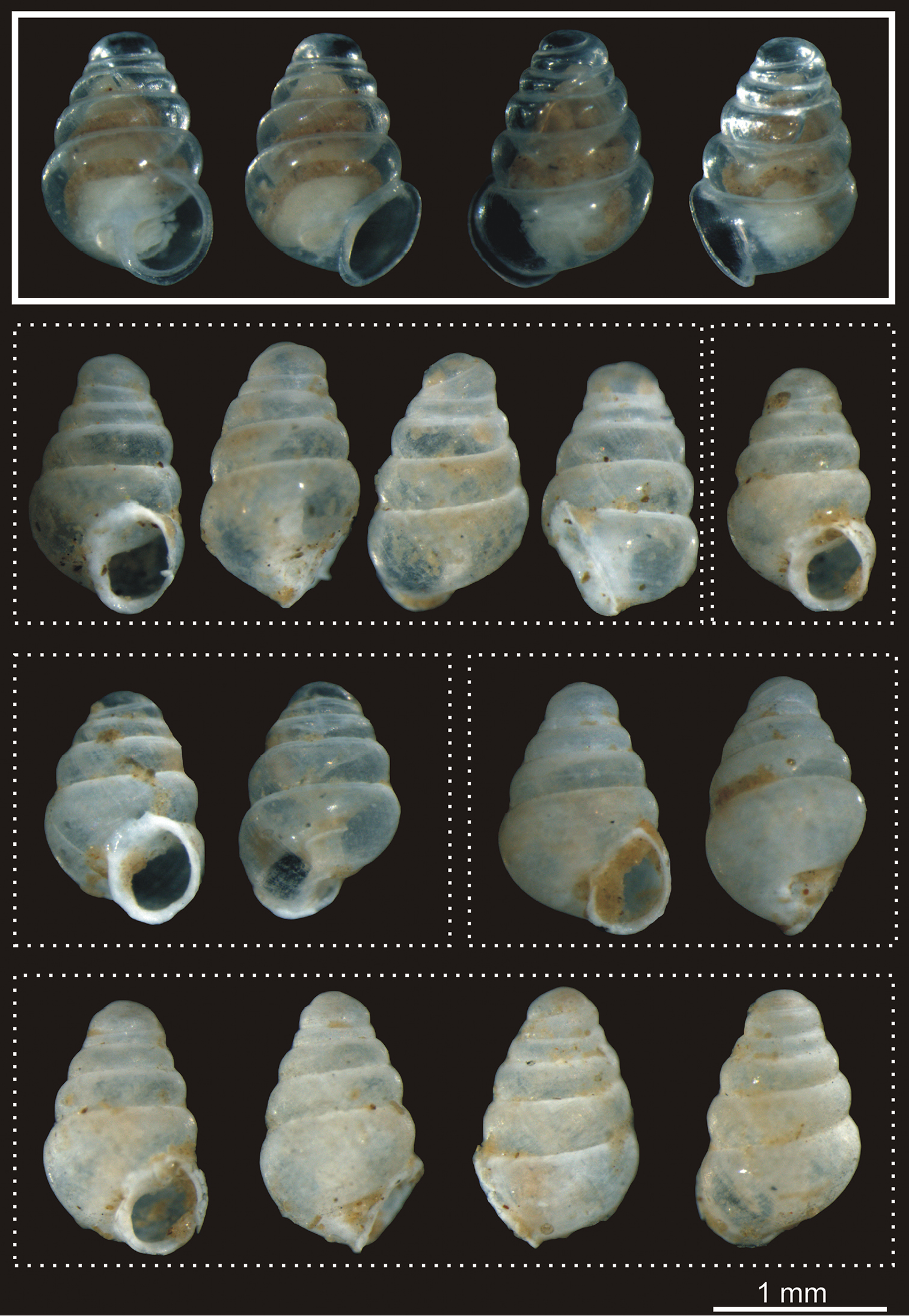
The holotype (surrounded by solid lines) and five paratypes (surrounded by broken lines) of Zospeum tholussum

Zospeum tholussum was formally described by the German taxonomist Alexander M. Weigand in 2013, based on the specimens the caving expedition recovered. The specific name is derived from Latin tholus, meaning dome or cupola, referring to the distinctive dome-like shape of the second whorl of the shell. The nine type specimens are currently deposited in the Forschungsinstitut und Naturmuseum Senckenberg in Frankfurt am Main, Germany (museum voucher SMF 341633). The eight empty shells were used as the paratypes by Weigand, one of which was broken open to investigate the central column of the shell, while the single living specimen was designated as the holotype. Zospeum tholussum is classified under the genus Zospeum of the subfamily Carychiinae in the hollow-shelled snail family, Ellobiidae. Although some authors (including Weigand) consider Carychiinae to be a separate family, Carychiidae.

Weigand identified Zospeum tholussum as a new species based on the morphology of the shells, as well as molecular genetic data recovered from the single living specimen. The DNA barcode of the Zospeum tholussum holotype, when compared with other DNA barcodes of Zospeum species, shows its lowest interspecific genetic distance to Zospeum pretneri. This result is well above the barcoding gap of 3.2% for Carychiinae, which is suitable to separate between species (> 3.2%, interspecific) and within species genetic diversity (< 3.2%, intraspecific) in Zospeum. Zospeum tholussum closely resemble Zospeum amoenum morphologically, but can be readily distinguished by the dome-like shape of their second whorls and by the presence of a slight fold in the central column of the shells. They can also be readily separated by means of their DNA barcodes (11.7% to 12.1% genetic $p$-distance between the two species).

Lukina jama–Trojama also contains a second yet undescribed species of Zospeum, also recovered by the 2012 expedition. It can be distinguished from Zospeum tholussum by its general shell shape, a more prominent fold in the shell central column, the absence of the dome-like structure on the second whorl, and the presence of a tooth. However, no living specimens of this species were recovered, so DNA barcodes could not be obtained to determine its exact taxonomic relationship with Zospeum tholussum.

== Description ==
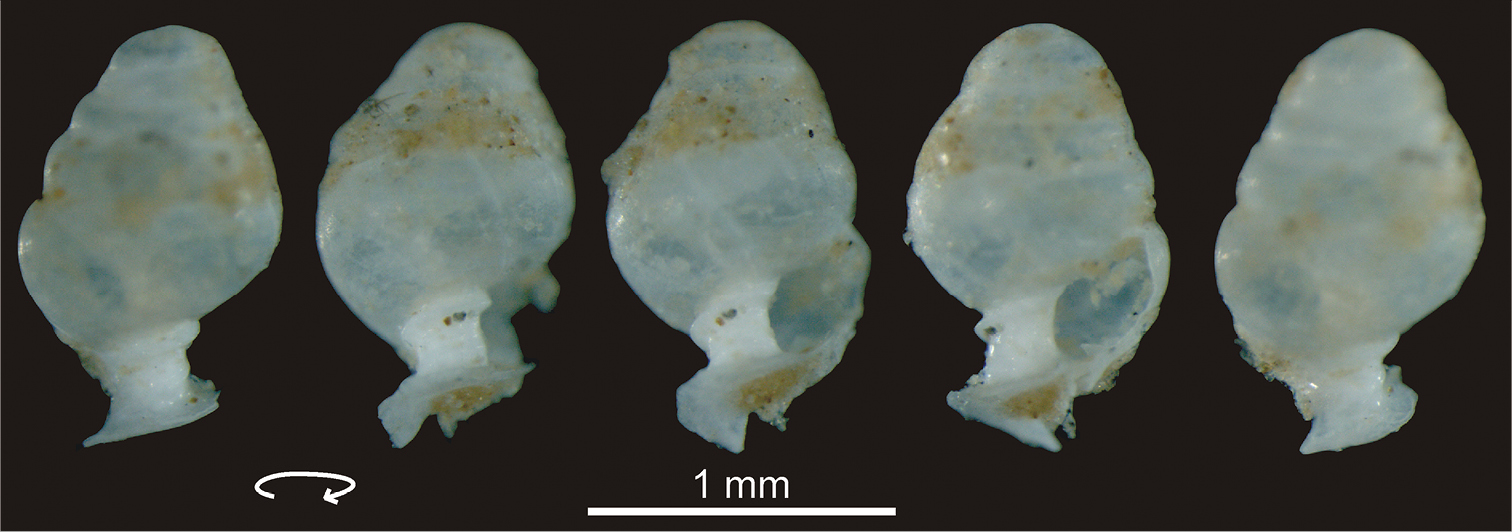
A specimen of Zospeum tholussum broken open and rotated clockwise to show the columellar fold

Zospeum tholussum are microscopic snails (microgastropods), with a shell height of only about 1.41 to 1.81 mm (0.056 to 0.071 in) and a shell width of about 0.93 to 1.12 mm (0.037 to 0.044 in). The shell height to width ratio is between 1.34 and 1.62. They possess about five to six whorls. The second whorl is distinctive for being greatly enlarged and dome-like in shape, with a height of about 2/3 to 5/6 of the heights of the third and fourth whorls combined.

The opening of the shell (aperture) is about 0.44 to 0.54 mm (0.017 to 0.021 in) in height and 0.38 to 0.46 mm (0.015 to 0.018 in) in width, with an aperture height to width ratio between 1.05 and 1.30. It is devoid of teeth. The central column of the shell (the columella) possesses a weakly developed columellar fold. The shells of the collected specimens of Zospeum tholussum have a moderately variable morphology between individuals in the species. They are typically very thin and fragile with a smooth surface. Fresh shells or those of living specimens are translucent, while older ones are more opaque, with a milky white color.

== Ecology ==
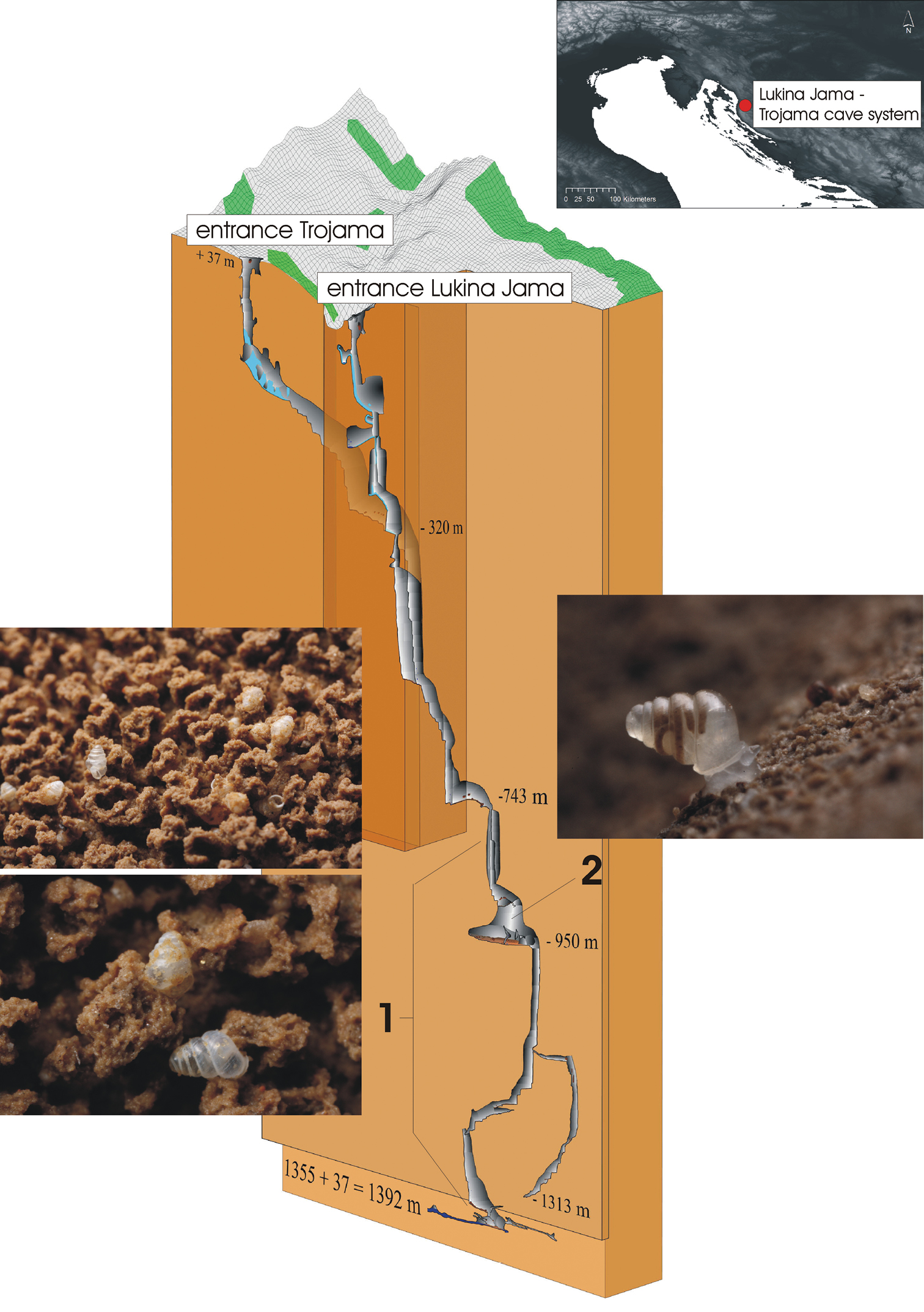
A 3D cross-section of the Lukina jama–Trojama cave system in the Velebit mountains of Croatia. The collection sites (1) of the shells and the single living specimen (2) are indicated, along with pictures by Jana Bedek of the HBSD.

Like all members of the genus Zospeum, Zospeum tholussum are completely blind. Because of this and their lack of pigmentation, they are considered to be true cave-dwelling organisms (eutroglobionts). Very little is known about their biology, but members of the genus Zospeum are known to prefer muddy to permanently wet subterranean microhabitats. They are generally found along the drainage systems of caves.

Due to their tiny shell sizes, Zospeum species are extremely slow-moving snails. In a week's time, they may only move a few millimeters or centimeters while grazing, usually in small circles around a given point. Because of their proximity to bodies of water and their preference for habitats with a mud substrate, Weigand and colleagues (2013) have proposed that the primary mode of dispersal of Zospeum species may be passive, either by being carried along in running water or through the activities of larger animals like cave bats or crickets.

== Distribution ==
Zospeum tholussum are currently only known from the Lukina jama–Trojama cave system of Croatia. Its distribution range is within the larger distribution range of the morphologically similar Zospeum amoenum (which is found in caves in the Western Balkans in northern Slovenia, western Croatia, Bosnia and Herzegovina, and Montenegro). Since Zospeum species with large inferred distribution ranges are known to actually also contain morphologically similar and unrecognized cryptic species, Weigand postulated that some early records of Zospeum amoenum may have actually been specimens of Zospeum tholussum.

== See also ==
- List of troglobites
- Zospeum biscaiense
