= Zospeum zaldivarae =

Scientific classification
- Domain: Eukaryota
- Kingdom: Animalia
- Phylum: Mollusca
- Class: Gastropoda
- Order: Ellobiida
- Family: Ellobiidae
- Genus: Zospeum
- Species: Z. zaldivarae

Binomial name
- Zospeum zaldivarae Prieto, De Winter, Weigand, Gomez & Jochum, 2015

Species of gastropod

Zospeum zaldivarae is a cave-dwelling species of air-breathing land snail.

== Description ==
This species has an average shell height of ca. 1.5 mm and an average shell width of ca. 1.2 mm. It is larger, wider and less elongated compared to other Zospeum species. The shell is transparent, when fresh, and chalky white with age. It has a turbinate-conical shape with approximately 5 1/2 regularly coiled, convex, rounded whorls. The last whorl is large, tumid and encompasses ca. 2/3 of the shell height. The opening (aperture) of the shell is crescent-shaped. Zospesum zaldivarae seems to be polymorphic regarding the presence/absence of the apertural barriers. Some individuals show an apertural dentition, some not. The apertural dentition (if any) consists of a small, short lamella on the parietal wall and a tooth on the parietal-columellar corner of the peristome. The columellar and palatal-basal lip are narrowly reflected. The umbilicus is closed, and the umbilical depression is deep. The teleoconch possess irregular axial striae or blunt growth lines, which are often crossed by a spiral element. In a small area immediately behind the palatal-basal lip some axial ribbing were observed. The peristome is higher than wide, taking up about half of the shell height. It is closely adhering to the spire and has an angular shape with a straight palatal-columellar callus.

== Discovery ==
Zospeum zaldivarae was discovered in the Cueva de Las Paúles in the Sierra Salvada in the Province of Burgos in Northern Spain by the biologist and speleologist Pilar Zaldívar in the 1980s.

== Taxonomy ==
Zospeum zaldivarae is named after Pilar Zaldívar, who is part of the Niphargus Speleoloical Team and discovered the species.

== Distribution ==
This species is only known from the type locality, Cueva de Las Paúles in the Sierra Salvada in the Province Burgos in Northern Spain.

== Ecology ==
Zospeum zaldivarae was identified on moist, muddy walls in a karst cave at an altitude of ca. 840 m. They were found embedded in a muddy sediment matrix, interspersed with a yellow- and white-coloured fungal aggregation.

== Conservation ==
Currently, Zospeum zaldivarae is known to inhabit only one locality. This locality is relatively easily accessible to the public and thereby threatened. Due to the limitation of the species to one locality and according to the Guidelines of the IUCN Red List, it is a vulnerable, narrow range endemic.
