= Novotettix =

Scientific classification
- Domain: Eukaryota
- Kingdom: Animalia
- Phylum: Arthropoda
- Class: Insecta
- Order: Orthoptera
- Suborder: Ensifera
- Family: Rhaphidophoridae
- Subfamily: Macropathinae
- Genus: Novotettix; Richards, 1966

Type species
- Novotettix naracoortensis Richards, 1966
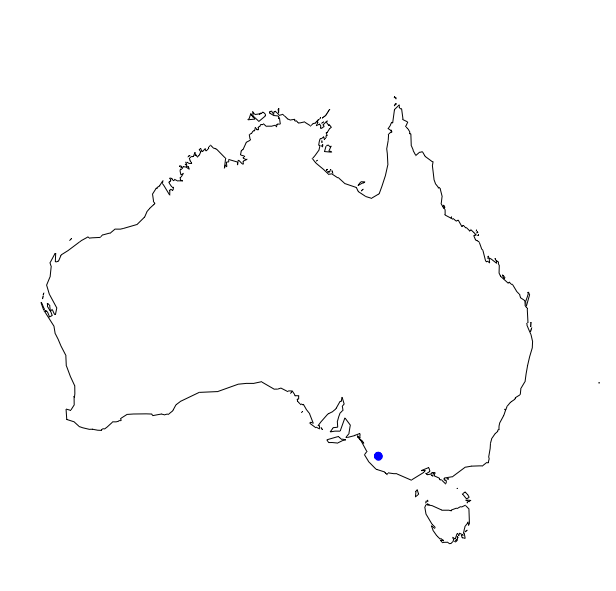
- Geographic distribution of Novotettix

Genus of insects

Novotettix is a monotypic genus of cave cricket/wētā in the family Rhaphidophoridae endemic to south-east Australia.

== Taxonomy ==
The genus Novotettix was first described by Aola M. Richards in 1966. The genus is closely related to the Tasmanian genus Micropathus.

== Morphology ==
Novotettix naracootensis is adapted to living in caves. It is wingless and can reach up to 18 mm (0.71 in) in length. It lacks auditory tympanal organs and does not make noise with its hind legs. It is brown in colour, making it inconspicuous in dark caves. Additionally, it has long antennae that extend up to five times the length of the body.

This genus exhibits sexual dimorphism, with females being larger than males. However, males have longer antennae than females.

== Diet ==
Novotettix naracootensis is an opportunistic feeder, foraging on a variety of vegetation, fungi and invertebrates, as well as on vertebrate carcasses. It has also been observed exhibiting cannibalism, with adults consuming both juveniles and deceased individuals.

== Distribution ==
This genus is restricted to low-elevation limestone caves in the south-east of Southern Australia in the region of Naracoorte. Populations can co-occur with bats but numbers are lower where forest has been removed around cave entrances and/or where there is high human activity.

== Behaviour ==
Novotettix is a nocturnal subtroglophile. It exhibits a bimodal locomotor rhythm, being most active around one hour after sunset. During the evening these cave crickets move down from the roof and walls of the caves to feed on the floor and at the cave entrance. Eggs are laid in the roof of the cave.
