= Horologion (beetle) =

Scientific classification
- Kingdom: Animalia
- Phylum: Arthropoda
- Clade: Pancrustacea
- Class: Insecta
- Order: Coleoptera
- Suborder: Adephaga
- Family: Carabidae
- Subfamily: Trechinae
- Tribe: Bembidiini
- Subtribe: Horologionina
- Genus: Horologion; Valentine, 1932

Genus of beetles

Horologion is a genus of trechine ground beetles in the family Carabidae. They are eyeless and have collected from caves in Virginia and West Virginia. As most of the specimens have been found deceased near drip pools, some researchers have suggested that the beetles do not inhabit the caves but are occasionally washed down from the overlying epikarst. Few specimens of either of the two Horologion species have been collected, possibly due to the inaccessibility of the karst microhabitat.

Members of this genus have an hourglass-shaped body and short appendages. The legs of Horologion beetles do not appear to be adapted for burrowing but their short size may allow the beetles to effectively maneuver in narrow spaces between rock layers.

== Species ==
There are two recognized species:

- Horologion hubbardi Harden & Davidson 2024
- Horologion speokoites Valentine 1932

== Description ==
The genus Horologion was described by the entomologist Joseph Manson Valentine in 1932 along with its founding member Horologion speokoites. The name is derived from the Greek horologion (Ωρολόγιον), used to refer to an hourglass or other timekeeping device, likely in reference to the beetle's shape.
