= Horologion hubbardi =

Conservation status
- Unranked (NatureServe)

Scientific classification
- Kingdom: Animalia
- Phylum: Arthropoda
- Clade: Pancrustacea
- Class: Insecta
- Order: Coleoptera
- Suborder: Adephaga
- Family: Carabidae
- Genus: Horologion
- Species: H. hubbardi

Binomial name
- Horologion hubbardi Harden & Davidson, 2024

Species of beetle

Horologion hubbardi, or Hubbard's hourglass beetle, is a trechine beetle collected from caves in Virginia.

== Description and habitat ==
Horologion hubbardi was described by Curt W. Harden and Robert L. Davidson in 2024 based on specimens collected from caves in Virginia. All of the specimens were found in or near drip pools and most of these were deceased, leading the authors to speculate that H. hubbardi is not a true cave dweller but an inhabitant of the overlying epikarst occasionally washed down into caves.

The scientific name of the species was chosen in honor of David A. Hubbard Jr., the speleobiologist who collected the first known specimen.

== Morphology ==
Horologion hubbardi is an eyeless beetle with an hourglass-shaped body. It has unusually short appendages, which may allow the beetle to more easily navigate through small crevices between layers of rock.

Collected specimens ranged from 3.16–3.20 mm (0.124–0.126 in) in length.

== Status ==
As of 2026, the Hubbard's hourglass beetle is considered critically imperiled by the state of Virginia (i.e., at very high risk of extirpation).
