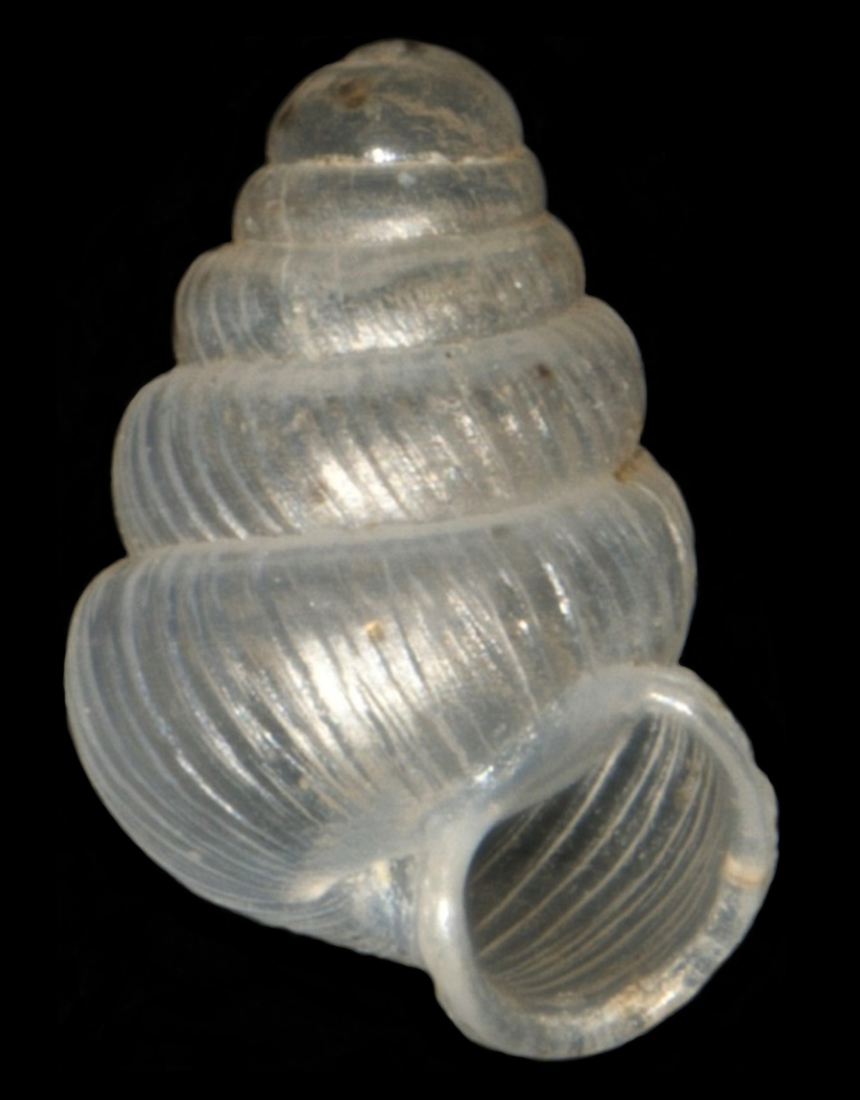
- Paratype of Zospeum percostulatum

Scientific classification
- Kingdom: Animalia
- Phylum: Mollusca
- Class: Gastropoda
- Order: Ellobiida
- Family: Ellobiidae
- Genus: Zospeum
- Species: Z. percostulatum

Binomial name
- Zospeum percostulatum Alonso, Prieto, Quiñonero-Salgado & Rolán, 2018

= Zospeum percostulatum =

Species of gastropod

Zospeum percostulatum is a species of air-breathing land snail, a terrestrial pulmonate gastropod mollusk in the family Ellobiidae, the salt marsh snails. This species is endemic to Asturias, Spain. It is known from several limestone caves near Llanes. Though there were a few old records of Zospeum in Asturias, dubiously identified as Z. suarezi and Z. schaufussi, Zospeum percostulatum is the first species described for this autonomous community.

Zospeum percostulatum are microscopic snails (microgastropods) with a shell height of less than 2 mm (thought relatively large for the genus), with a distinctive costulated surface. Live individuals has been collected on concretionated cave walls covered by a wet film of percolated clay.
