= Endre Dudich =

Hungarian professor, academician and zoologist

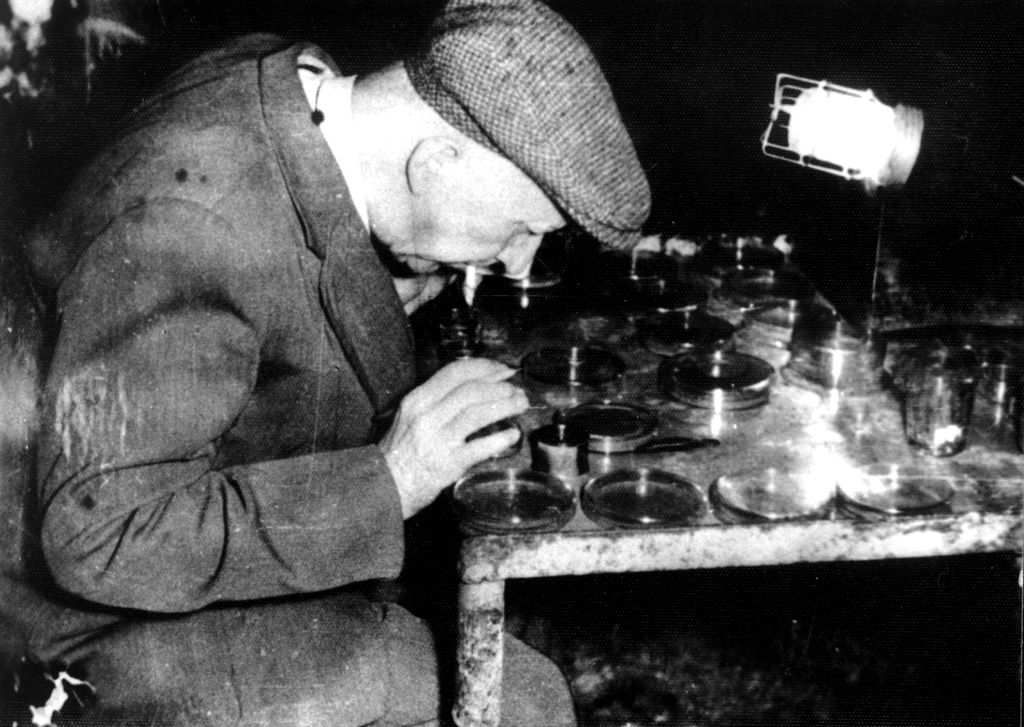
- Endre Dudich at work in the Baradla cave
- Born: 20 March 1895; Nagysalló, Hungary
- Died: 5 February 1971 (aged 75); Budapest, Hungary
- Resting place: Farkasréti Cemetery
- Education: Pázmány Péter University; University of Szeged
- Spouse: Józsa Vendl
- Children: Endre
- Awards: Kossuth Prize; Kadic Ottokar medal
- Scientific career
- Fields: Zoology, Taxonomy
- Workplaces: Pázmány Péter University
- Thesis: (1922)
- Author abbrev. (zoology): Dudich

Endre Dudich (20 March 1895 – 5 February 1971) was a Hungarian Kossuth Prize-winning professor, academician, and zoologist, noted for his application of mathematical methods for variational study of insects.

== Early life and education ==
Born in Nagysalló, Hungary, Dudich was educated at grammar school in Esztergom until 1913. His father was a doctor who passed on an interest in zoology to his son. His education was interrupted by the First World War where he served three and a half years at the front. He returned to the natural history and geography faculty of the Pázmány Péter University, Budapest, and obtained a teaching diploma in 1920. He obtained his doctorate at the University of Szeged in 1922.

== Career ==
From 1919, Dudich worked at the Zoological Department of the Hungarian National Museum in Budapest. He became a university lecturer in 1925 and, in 1934, as associate professor, he established the first Systematic Zoology and Animal Geographical Institute within Pázmány Péter University. In 1936 he was appointed and established as professor.

Endre Dudich was commissioned to establish the Institute for Danube Research Station in Lower Göd which he led from 1958 to 1970, and the initiation of the institutional zoological research cave at Baradla cave. His book on Systematic Zoology co-authored with former student, Imre Loksa, became a standard text on the subject.

He chaired the Hungarian Academy of Sciences a total of four times; as corresponding member in 1932 and elected full member in 1942. For political reasons he was deprived of academic membership in 1949 but regained the chair in 1951 as corresponding member, and was elected a full member again in 1964.

He was awarded the Kossuth Prize in 1957.

He remained at the university until his death in February 1971. The Institute was subsequently headed by his former students; János Balogh and Imre Loksa. The Institute's modern successor is the Institute of Systematic Zoology and Ecology, Eötvös Loránd University.

== Key research areas ==
- Beetles (Coleoptera) taxonomy and geography
- Crustacean taxonomy, anatomy and animal geography
- Biometric methods for the examination of morphological variability
- Local aquatic habitats, hydrobiology
- Karst - and speleology
- Forest soils Arthropod production, biological testing (Janos Balogh and Imre Loksa)

=== Cave and Karst research ===
His work as a researcher on caves and karst and their fauna started through his friendship with Elemér Bokor. He became a founder and committee member of the Hungarian Speleological Society in 1926.

Dudich started research on flora and fauna of the Baradla cave at Aggtelek, often working under very difficult and often miserable conditions. His research went beyond cave fauna, laying the foundation of modern zoology. The Department of Zoology published his results under the title of The Aggtelek cave flora and fauna food resources in 1930, and in 1931 the Hungarian Natural History Society awarded him the Margó-díját (Margins Award). A more speleological work-related travel book was published in 1932; The Aggtelek stalactite cave and its surroundings.

In 1932 his work was published as part of a series of speleology monographs Biologie der Aggteleker Tropfsteinhöhle Baradla in Ungarn (Biology of the Aggtelek stalactite cave Baradla in Hungary). This extensive 246 page work for one of the leading European cave biology societies established his name.

In 1934 Benno Wolf invited him to write the introduction of Catalogus Cavernarum Animalium.

In 1958 the world's fourth cave biological laboratory was built at the Baradla cave and laboratory work dominated the rest of Dudich's life. That same year the Hungarian Karst and Cave Research Association re-formed. Dudich chaired the Association's committee from 1961 to 1965 and between 1959 and 1965 Dudich was editor of the Association's Cave and Karst Research journal. His contribution to science was recognised by the award of the Kadić Ottokár medal. In 1968 he was made honorary member and honorary president of the Society and remained in office until his death.

Dudich's unstinting efforts revitalised cave biology research, encouraging young researchers to pursue cave fauna studies.

== Memorials ==
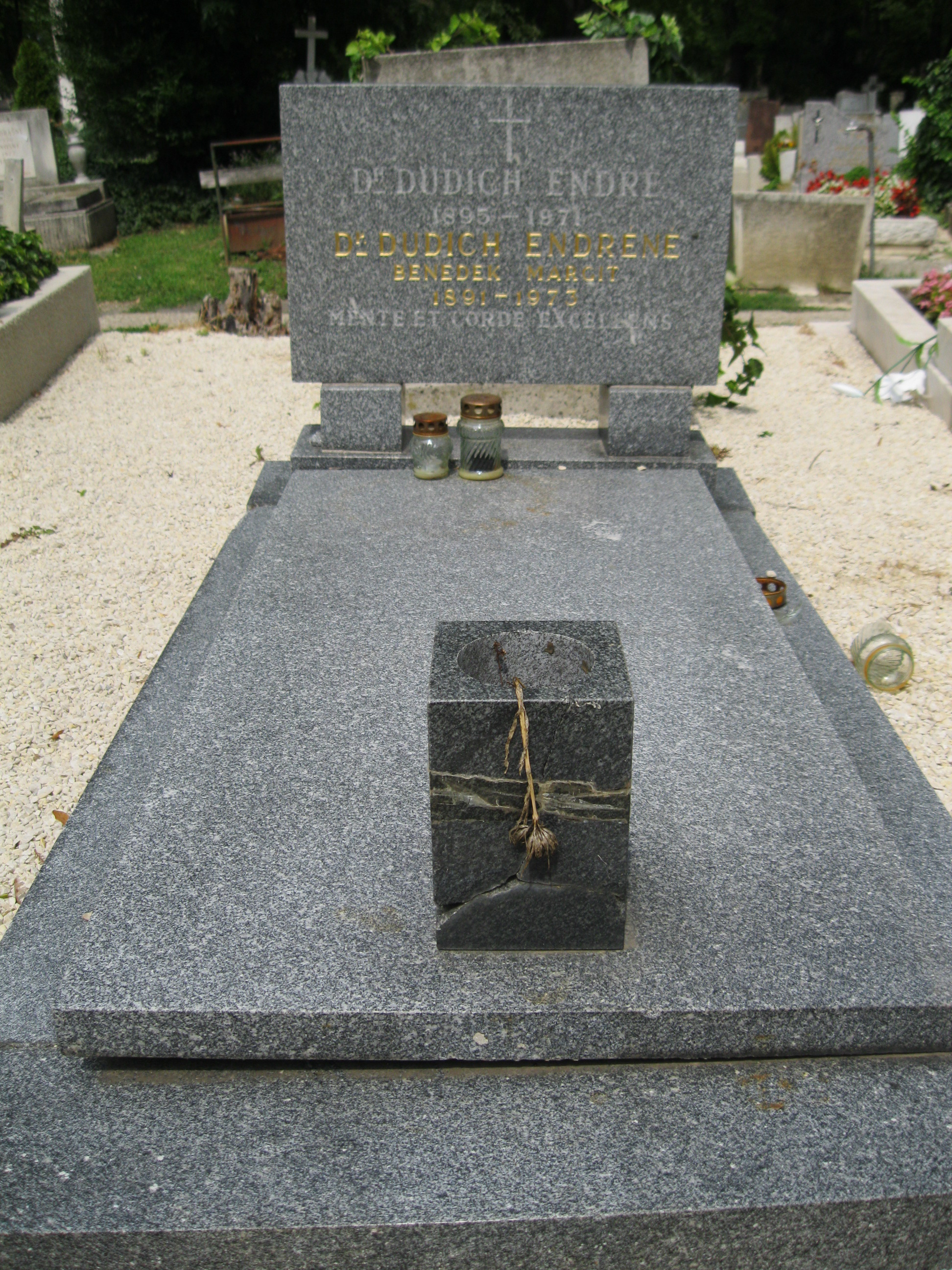
Dudich's grave in Farkasréti cemetery

The southern block (0-817) of Lágymányosi Eötvös University Campus is named after Endre Dudich. His grave is in the Farkasréti Cemetery (6/1-1-36).

== Bibliography ==
- Dudich, E. (1922). "Math. Termt. Ert". Archiv für Naturgeschichte (in German). 89 (276): 1–4.
- Dudich, E. (1923). "Eine neue Neolucanus-Art aus Formosa". Entomologische Blätter. 19 (1): 17–18.
- Dudich, E. (1923). "Über die Variation des Cyclommatus tarandus Thunberg (Coleopt., Lucanidae)". Archiv für Naturgeschichte. 89 (1–4): 62–96.
- Dudich, E. (1923). "Über einen somatischen Zwitter der Hirsckäfers (sic)". Entomologische Blätter. 19 (3): 129–133.
- Dudich, E. (1924). "Eine für Ungarn neue Amphipoden-Art". Ann. Historico-naturales Musei Nat. Hungarici (21). Budapest: 21.
- Dudich, E. (1931). "Az Aggteleki-barlang vizeiről". Hidr. Közl. 1930: 1–33.
- Dudich, E. (1931). "A barlangok biológiai kutatásáról". Áll. Közl. XXVIII: 1–23.
- Dudich, E. (1932). "Biologie der Aggteleken Tropfsteinhöhle "Baradla" in Ungarn". Speleolog. Monogr. XII. Wien.
- Dudich, E. (1932). "Biologie der Aggteleker Tropfsteinhöhle Baradla". Speläologische Monographien (13). Wien: 1–246.
- Dudich, E. (1932). "Az Aggteleki-cseppkőbarlang és környéke Bp".
- Dudich, E. (1940). "Ein neuer Niphargus aus Ungarn". Fragmenta Faunistica Hungarica (3). Budapest: 1–16.
- Dudich, E. (1941). "Niphargus aus einer Therme von Budapest". Ann. Hist. Musei Nat. Hungarici, Pars Zoologica. Budapest: 166–176.
- Dudich, E. (1941). "Niphargus mediodanubialis sp. nov., die am weitesten verbreitete Niphargus-Art des mittleren Donaubeckens". Fragmenta Faunistica Hungarica (4). Budapest: 61–63.
- Dudich, E. (1943). "Neue Niphargus-Arten aus siebenbürgischen Grundwässern". Ann. Hist. Musei Nat. Hungarici, Pars Zoologica (36). Budapest: 47–63.
- Dudich, E. (1959). "A barlangbiológia és problémái". (Biospeologica Hungarica VI.). A Magyar Tudományos Akadémia Biológiai Csoportjának Közleményei. 3 (3–4): 323–357.
- Dudich, E. (1960). "Das höhlenbiologische Laboratorium der Eötvös Loránd Universität (Biospeologica Hungarica, X.)". Annls Univ. Scient. Bpest. (3). Rolando Eöstvös: 131–135.
- Dudich, E. (1960). "Über das ungarische Laboratorium für Höhlenbiologie : Biospeologica hungarica 1959 - 1961". Karszt-Barlangk (2): 95–100.
- Dudich, E. (1965). "Höhlenbiologisches aus Ungarn 1958-1962". Karszt- és Barlangkutatás. IV: 41–53.
- Dudich, E. (1969). "Díszelnöki székfoglaló beszéde". Karszt és Barlang. I: 1–4.
