= Troglofauna =

Species that lives in caves and similar subterranean environments

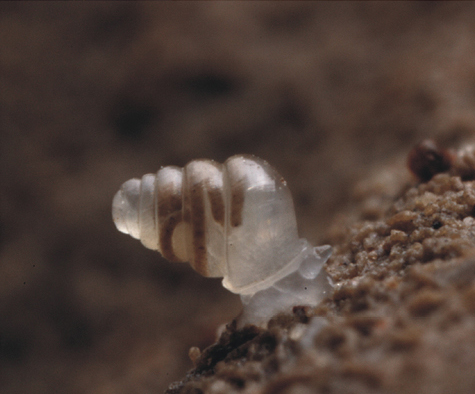
The microscopic cave snail Zospeum tholussum, found at depths of 743 to 1,392 m (2,438 to 4,567 ft) in the Lukina Jama–Trojama cave system of Croatia, is completely blind with a translucent shell

Troglofauna are small cave-dwelling animals that have adapted to their dark surroundings. Troglofauna and stygofauna are the two types of subterranean fauna (based on life-history). Both are associated with subterranean environments – troglofauna are associated with caves and spaces above the water table and stygofauna with water. Troglofaunal species include arachnids, insects, myriapods and others. Some troglofauna live permanently underground and cannot survive outside the cave environment. Loss of under-used senses is apparent in the lack of pigmentation as well as eyesight in most troglofauna. Troglofauna insects may exhibit longer appendages and a lack of wings.

== Ecological categories ==
Troglofauna are divided into three main categories based on their ecology:

- Troglobionts (or troglobites): species, or populations of species, strictly bound to subterranean habitats.
- Troglophiles: species living mainly aboveground but also in subterranean habitats. These are further divided into eutroglophiles (aboveground species also able to maintain a permanent subterranean population) and subtroglophiles (species inclined to perpetually or temporarily inhabit a subterranean habitat, but strongly associated with aboveground habitats for some functions).
- Trogloxenes: species only occurring sporadically in an underground habitat and unable to establish a subterranean population.

== Environment ==
Troglofauna usually live in moderate cave regions. The overall climates of these caves do not significantly change throughout the year. Humidity in such caves is generally high ranging from 95 to 100 percent; evaporation rates are low.

The cave ecosystem in which troglofauna reside can be divided into four zones: entrance, twilight, transition and deep cave. The entrance zone is where the surface and underground environments meet. Light becomes scarcer in the twilight zone. The transition zone is almost completely dark; however some outside environmental effects can still be felt. Finally, the deep cave zone is completely dark, relatively stable, and exhibits no evaporation. Troglobites are usually found in the deep cave zone.

== Diet and lifecycle ==
Troglofauna have adapted to the limited food supply and are extremely energy efficient. Food is found from "twigs, leaves, bacteria and epigean animals (including zooplankton)." Food is also found from trogloxene carcasses, egg deposits, and faeces such as bat guano. Troglofaunal beetles are predators and may feed on other troglofaunal animals rather than bacteria, twigs and guano.

Francis G. Howarth hypothesized on adaptations troglofauna have made to exist in the cave environment, postulating that troglofauna "have lost many of the water conservation mechanisms of surface relatives, and more nearly resemble permanently aquatic arthropods in water balance mechanisms, including cuticular permeability." Troglofauna thrive in a humid environment and when a "chamber is too dry ... animals display either agitated or comatose behavior", indicating they are highly susceptible to changes in temperature and humidity. To survive in an environment where food is scarce and oxygen levels are low, troglofauna often have very low metabolism. As a result, troglofauna may live longer than other terrestrial species.

== Reproduction ==
Reproduction varies by species and may be infrequent, but very little is known.

== Evolution and dispersal ==
Troglofauna have evolved in isolation. Stratigraphic barriers, such as rock walls and layers, and fluvial barriers, such as rivers and streams, prevent or hinder the dispersal of these animals. Consequently, troglofauna habitat and food availability can be very disjunct and precluding a great range in diversity across the landscape.

== Species ==
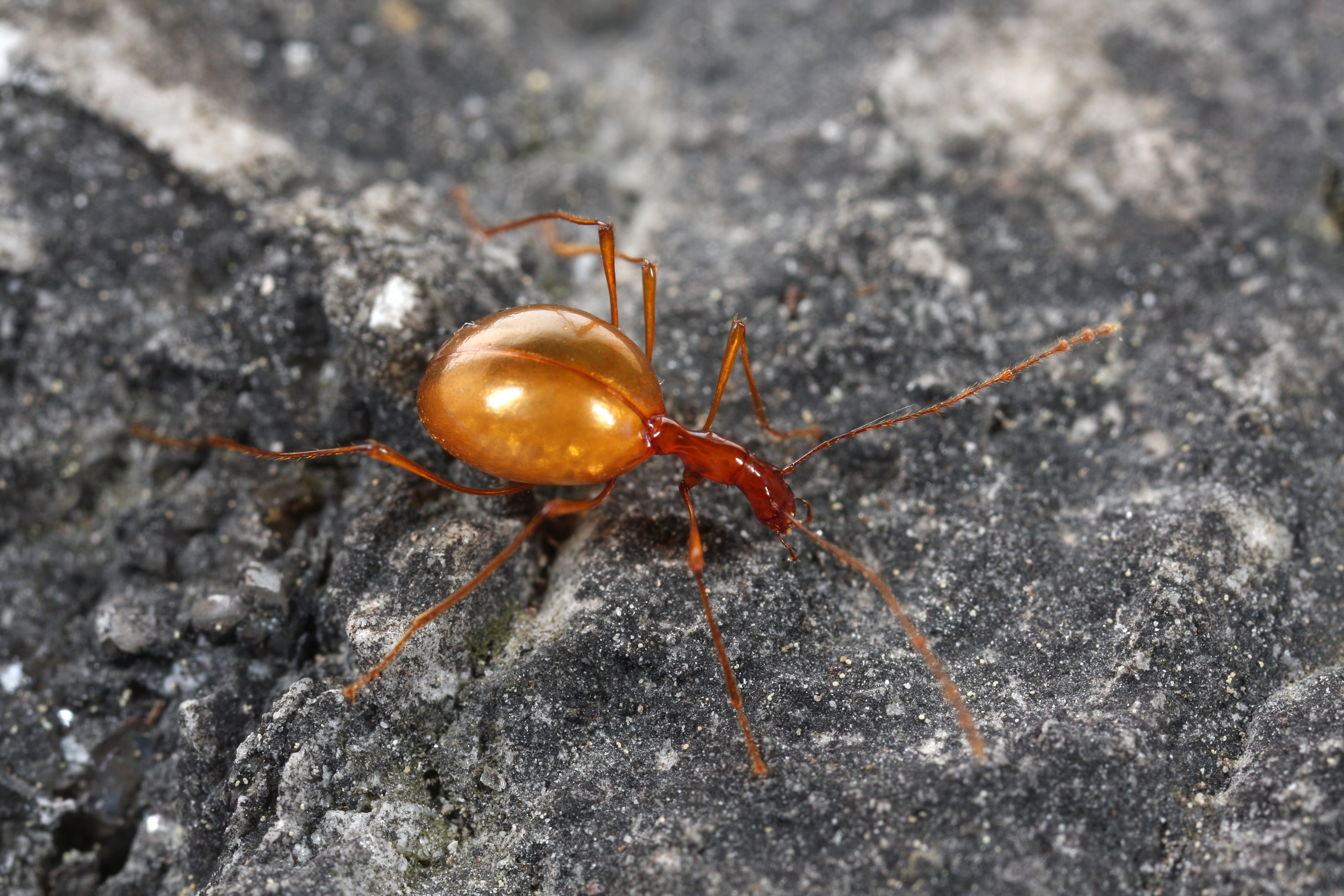
The cave beetle Leptodirus hochenwartii

Troglofaunal species include representatives of many animal groups, including gastropods, centipedes, millipedes, spiders, pseudoscorpions, harvestmen, isopods, collembolans, diplurans, beetles and salamanders. Troglofaunal gastropods are endemic to the U.S. and in Europe; they are mostly concentrated in the northeastern Mediterranean regions. Troglofaunal scorpions are mostly found in Mexican caves. Troglobitic spiders are found more widespread in the U.S., Europe, and Japan. However, they are also found in Mexico, the Congos (the DRC and the RotC), Cuba, Australia, and the Philippines.

Troglofauna are found worldwide. Troglofaunal salamanders are found in Europe and the U.S.

Many caves remain undiscovered due to lack of visible entrances and more habitat exists in fissures, vugs and other spaces above the watertable. Consequently, many species of troglofauna may not have been discovered.

== Discovery ==
More troglofaunal species are being identified. A report from 2007 described how scientists had recently discovered 255 new caves and 30 undescribed invertebrate species in Sequoia and Kings Canyon National Parks of Sierra Nevada mountains, California – "an extraordinary number for such a small area", according to National Geographic.

== Threats to troglofauna ==
Floodwaters can be detrimental to troglofaunal species, by dramatically changing the availability of habitat, food and connectivity to other habitats and oxygen. Many troglofaunal species are likely to be sensitive to changes in their environment and floods, which can accompany a drop in temperature that may adversely affect some animals. Extreme winter temperatures may affect troglofaunal species near the surface. Birds and bats in caves prey on troglofauna. Troglofauna are likely to compete with each other for survival.

Humans also pose a threat to troglofauna. Mismanagement of contaminants (e.g. pesticides and sewage) may poison troglofaunal communities, whilst removal of habitat, either directly or indirectly (e.g. rising watertable) is also a major threat.

== See also ==
- Biospeleology
- Cave conservation
- List of troglobites
- Speleology
- Subterranean fauna
- Subterranean river
