= Micropathus =

Scientific classification
- Domain: Eukaryota
- Kingdom: Animalia
- Phylum: Arthropoda
- Class: Insecta
- Order: Orthoptera
- Suborder: Ensifera
- Family: Rhaphidophoridae
- Subfamily: Macropathinae
- Genus: Micropathus; Richards, 1964

Species
- See text.

Genus of crickets

Micropathus is an Australian genus of cave crickets within the subfamily Macropathinae established by A. M. Richards in 1964. There are five species within this genus, all found in Tasmania.

== Morphology ==
Sexual dimorphism is not evident in the Micropathus genus beyond the presence of ovipositor and associated variation in subgenital plates that occur in females. The genus displays numerous short setae covering all segments of the body. Apical spines and spurs are abundant on the limbs with varying numbers of pairs found on the fore femur, fore tibia, mid femur, mid tibia, and hind tibia.

== Diet ==
Cave crickets M. cavernicola and M. tasmaniensis are omnivorous scavengers, relying on plant and animal tissues such as fungal hyphae and algae that can be obtained around cave entrances. Leaves and twigs from angiosperms are periodically washed into caves providing an additional food source for cave crickets. Observational data of M. tasmaniensis at Cashion Creek Cave and in a confined captive setting indicate that cannibalism occurs within this genus.

== Distribution ==
All five species in the genus Micropathus are found in caves and rain forest of Tasmania, where they are more common than the endemic Rhaphidophoriae genera Parvotettix, Tasmanoplectron and Cavernotettix. Their distribution may have been in part guided by glaciation during the Pleistocene. They usually appear around the entrance and within 30 metres (98 ft) inside the caves they inhabit. This includes the entrance, twilight, and transition macro habitats within a cave environment.

M. tasmaniensis is primarily located in Southeast Tasmania.

M. cavernicola is primarily located in the Northern and Western parts of Tasmania.

== Genetics ==
The genetic sex determination mechanism of M. fuscus is based on the ratio of X chromosomes to autosomes, with females carrying two X chromosomes where males of this species carry one. This is consistent with karyotypes of the majority of species within the subfamily of Macropathinae.

== Species ==
- Micropathus cavernicola Richards, 1964
- Micropathus fuscus Richards, 1968
- Micropathus kiernani Richards, 1974
- Micropathus montanus Richards, 1971
- Micropathus tasmaniensis Richards, 1964
