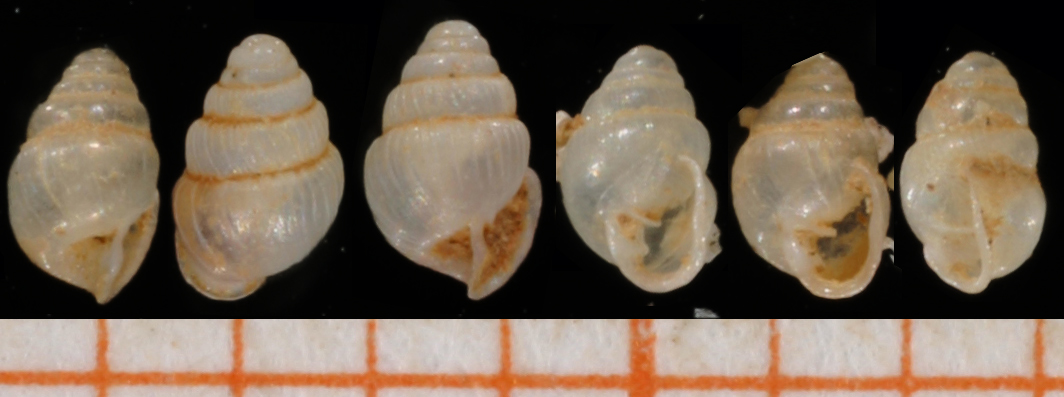

Scientific classification
- Kingdom: Animalia
- Phylum: Mollusca
- Class: Gastropoda
- Order: Ellobiida
- Family: Ellobiidae
- Subfamily: Carychiinae
- Genus: Zospeum; Bourguignat, 1856

= Zospeum =

Genus of gastropods

Zospeum is a genus of air-breathing land snails, terrestrial pulmonate gastropod mollusks in the family Ellobiidae, the salt marsh snails.

== Species ==
Species within the genus Zospeum include:

  - Zospeum allegrettii Conci, 1956
  - Zospeum alpestre (Freyer, 1855)
    - Zospeum alpestre alpestre (Freyer, 1855)
    - Zospeum alpestre kupitzense A. Stummer, 1984
    - Zospeum alpestre bolei Slapnik, 1991
  - Zospeum amoenum (Frauenfeld, 1856)
  - Zospeum bellesi Gittenberger, 1973
  - Zospeum biscaiense Gómez & Prieto, 1983
  - Zospeum bucculentum Inäbnit, Jochum & Neubert 2019
  - Zospeum cariadeghense Allegretti, 1944
  - Zospeum clathratum Inäbnit, Jochum & Neubert 2019
  - Zospeum costatum (Freyer, 1855)
  - Zospeum exiguum Kuščer, 1932
  - Zospeum frauenfeldii (Freyer, 1855)
    - Zospeum frauenfeldii frauenfeldii (Freyer, 1855)
    - Zospeum frauenfeldii osolei Slapnik, 1994
  - Zospeum freyeri (F.J. Schmidt, 1849)
  - Zospeum galvagnii Conci, 1956
  - Zospeum globosum Kušcer, 1928
  - Zospeum gittenbergeri Jochum, Prieto & De Winter, 2019
  - Zospeum isselianum Pollonera, 1887
  - Zospeum kupitzense A. Stummer, 1984
  - Zospeum kusceri Wagner, 1912
  - Zospeum lamellatum Bole, 1974
  - Zospeum lautum (Frauenfeld, 1854)
  - Zospeum likanum Bole, 1960
  - Zospeum manitaense Inäbnit, Jochum & Neubert 2019
  - Zospeum obesum (Frauenfeld, 1854)
  - Zospeum percostulatum Alonso, Prieto, Quiñonero-Salgado & Rolán, 2018
  - Zospeum pagodulum Inäbnit, Jochum & Neubert 2019
  - Zospeum praetermissum Jochum, Prieto & De Winter, 2019
  - Zospeum pretneri Bole, 1960
  - Zospeum robustum Inäbnit, Jochum & Neubert 2019
  - Zospeum schaufussi Frauenfeld, 1862
  - Zospeum spelaeum (Rossmässler, 1839))
    - Zospeum spelaeum spelaeum (Rossmässler, 1839)
    - Zospeum spelaeum schmidti (Frauenfeld, 1854)
  - Zospeum subobesum Bole, 1974
  - Zospeum tholussum Weigand, 2013
  - Zospeum trebicianum Stossich, 1899
  - Zospeum turriculatum Allegretti, 1944
  - Zospeum troglobalcanicum Absolon, 1916
  - Zospeum vasconicum Prieto, De Winter, Weigand, Gómez & Jochum, 2015
  - Zospeum zaldivarae Prieto, De Winter, Weigand, Gómez & Jochum, 2015

== Literature ==
- Weigand, AM 2013: New Zospeum species (Gastropoda, Ellobioidea, Carychiidae) from 980 m depth in the Lukina Jama–Trojama cave system (Velebit Mts., Croatia). Subterranean Biology 11, 45-53. doi:10.3897/subtbiol.11.5966
- Weigand, AM, Jochum, A, Slapnik, R, Schnitzler, J, Zarza, E und Klussmann-Kolb, A 2013: Evolution of microgastropods (Ellobioidea, Carychiidae): integrating taxonomic, phylogenetic and evolutionary hypotheses. BMC Evolutionary Biology 2013, 13:18 (PDF; 2,7 MB)
- Jochum, A., Weigand, A. M., Slapnik, R., Valentinčič, J., & Prieto, C. E. (2012). The microscopic ellobioid, Zospeum Bourguignat, 1856 (Pulmonata, Ellobioidea, Carychiidae) makes a big debut in Basque Country and the province of Burgos (Spain). MalaCo, 8, 400-403.(PDF)
