= Zospeum biscaiense =

Conservation status
- Near Threatened (IUCN 3.1)

Scientific classification
- Kingdom: Animalia
- Phylum: Mollusca
- Class: Gastropoda
- Order: Ellobiida
- Family: Ellobiidae
- Genus: Zospeum
- Species: Z. biscaiense

Binomial name
- Zospeum biscaiense Gomez & Prieto, 1983
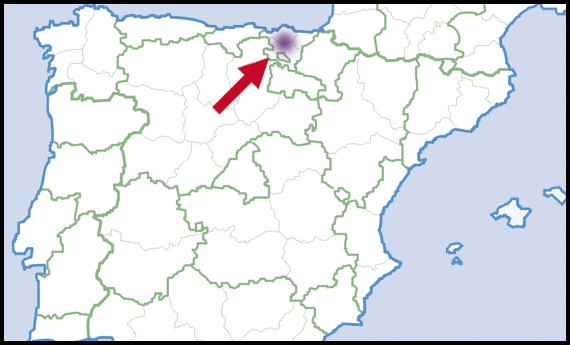

Species of gastropod

Zospeum biscaiense is a species of air-breathing land snail, a terrestrial pulmonate gastropod mollusk in the family Ellobiidae, the salt marsh snails. This species is endemic to Spain.
