= Ferdinand Joseph Schmidt =

Austro-Hungarian businessman, naturalist and explorer

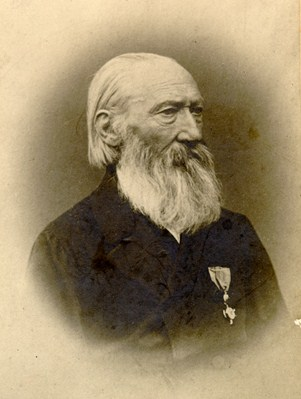

Ferdinand Joseph Schmidt (also known as Ferdinand Jožef Schmidt or Ferdinand Jožef Šmit) (20 February 1791, Sopron – 16 February 1878, Ljubljana) was an Austro-Hungarian businessman, naturalist and explorer who was among the pioneers of biospeleology, the study of cave fauna.

Schmidt was the son of a tobacco manufacturer. He was born in Sopron (Hungary) and worked briefly in Vienna and later in Laibach (present day Ljubljana, Slovenia). In Vienna he worked for Count Herberstein and then became a businessman in 1809. He served in the coalition wars and left as a non-commissioned officer in 1812 to work in Weißbrunn. In 1815 he went on a business trip to Ljubljana where he was offered a manager position, which he took up. He started his own business in October 1819 selling dyes and seeds. The business grew, helped by the Congress of Laibach in 1821, and he soon acquired real estate and began to study the flora and fauna of Carniola.

Schmidt explored the mountains and limestone caves of the region and described the beetle Leptodirus hochenwartii discovered by Franz Graf von Hohenwart in the caves of Postojna. He also helped identify routes for the Trieste to Laibach railway lines. He tried to grow various fruits and trees in the karst region and at the same time started collecting insects. He also contributed to collections of the State Museum of Carniola which was founded in 1821 by the Count of Hohenwart.

Schmidt was a member of numerous scholarly societies including the Natural Research Society in Görlitz, the Senckenberg Nature Research Society, the Natural History Society in Nuremberg and the Wetterau Society for Natural History in Hanau am Main. He also served as a trustee of the Laibach Sparkasse Association and was a member of the Ukrainian Provincial and Trade Commission. The Imperial Chamber of Commerce in Vienna, by decree of October 20, 1839, recognized him for his services to trade in Ljubljana. In 1867 he was made an honorary citizen of the city of Ljubljana and in 1869 he received the Golden Cross of Merit with Crown.
