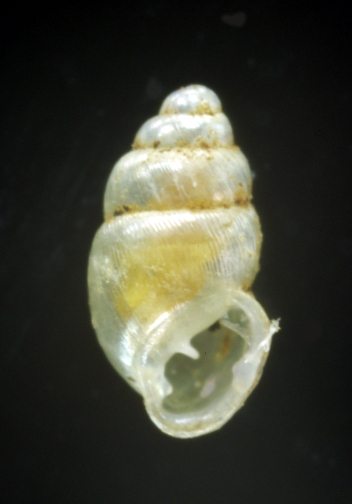
- Apertural view of a shell of Carychium minimum

Scientific classification
- Kingdom: Animalia
- Phylum: Mollusca
- Class: Gastropoda
- Order: Ellobiida
- Superfamily: Ellobioidea
- Family: Ellobiidae
- Subfamily: Carychiinae; Jeffreys, 1830

Synonyms
- Carychiidae Jeffreys, 1830 (original rank); Zospeidae Brusina, 1886

= Carychiinae =

Subfamily of gastropods

Carychiinae is a taxonomic subfamily of minute air-breathing land snails, terrestrial pulmonate gastropod mollusks.

== Taxonomy ==
Carychiinae is part of the family Ellobiidae (according to the taxonomy of the Gastropoda by Bouchet & Rocroi, 2005).

Some authors consider Carychiidae as a separate family.

== Genera ==
Genera within the subfamily Carychiinae include:

- Carychiella Strauch, 1977
- Carychiopsina Kadolsky, 2020 †
- Carychiopsis Sandberger, 1872 †
- Carychium O. F. Müller, 1773 - type genus of the subfamily Carychiinae
- Koreozospeum Jochum, Prozorova, Sharyi-ool & Páll-Gergely, 2015
- Ovicarychium Kadolsky, 2020 †
- Turricarychium Kadolsky, 2020 †
- Zospeum Bourguignat, 1856
- Zuella Kadolsky, 2020 †

== Ecology ==
One lineage of the Ellobioidea, the Carychiidae has successfully accomplished a complete transition onto land. Extant carychiid snails inhabit aphotic and permanently wet epigean (Carychium) or subterranean (Zospeum) environments throughout their Holarctic distribution. This dramatic shift from a marine to a terrestrial habitat has occurred independently of the stylommatophoran land-snails of the Eupulmonata.
