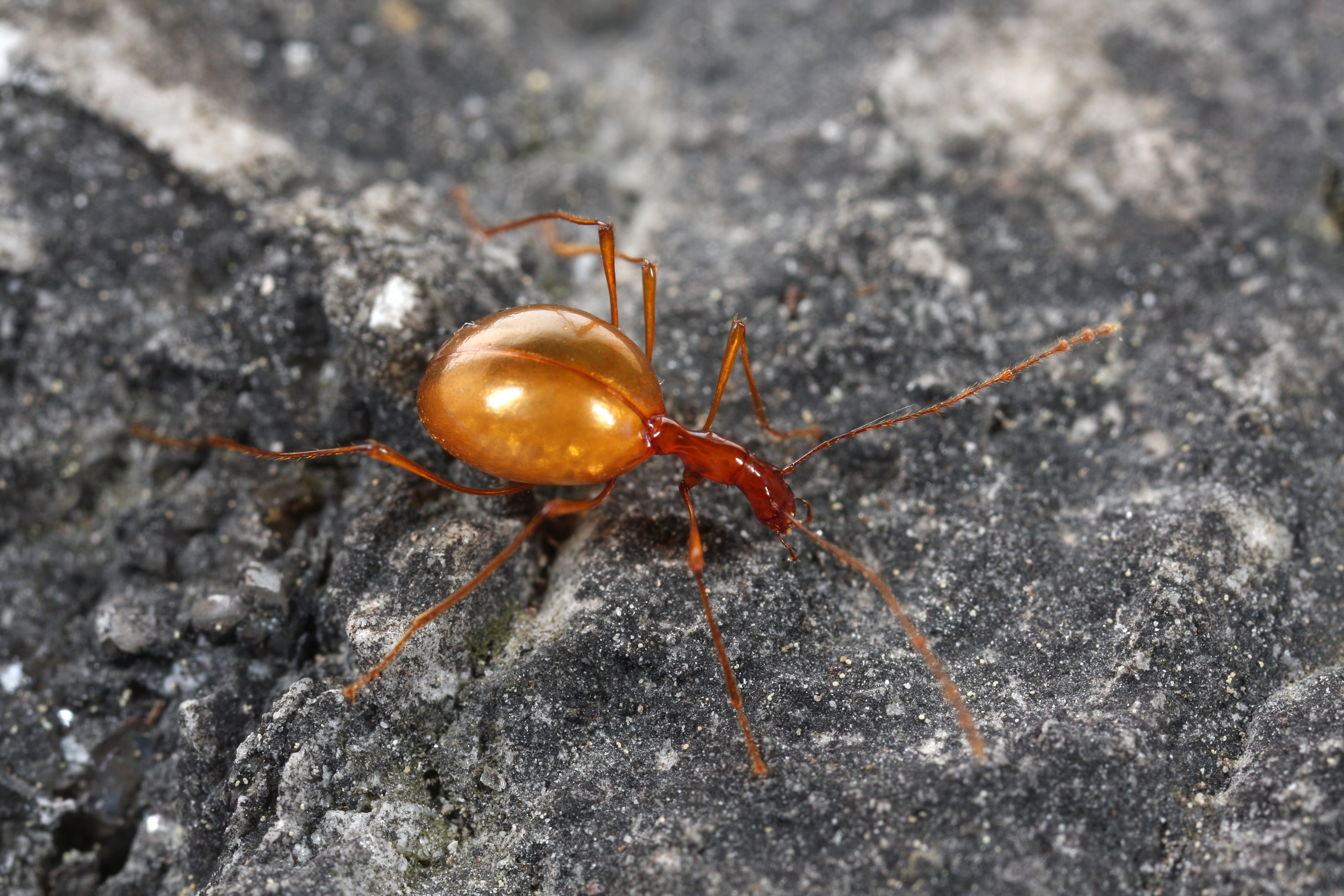

Scientific classification
- Kingdom: Animalia
- Phylum: Arthropoda
- Class: Insecta
- Order: Coleoptera
- Suborder: Polyphaga
- Infraorder: Staphyliniformia
- Family: Leiodidae
- Subfamily: Cholevinae
- Tribe: Leptodirini
- Genus: Leptodirus; Schmidt, 1832
- Species: L. hochenwartii

Binomial name
- Leptodirus hochenwartii Schmidt, 1832

= Leptodirus =

Genus of beetles

Leptodirus is a cave beetle in the family Leiodidae. The genus contains only the single species Leptodirus hochenwartii. (Note: The name is a source of some confusion; the beetle was originally named Leptodirus Hochenwartii, but the specific name is linguistically incorrect, and there are several spelling variants of the name of the person it was named after. Many sources therefore write it as hohenwarti.) It is a true troglobite, endemic to Slovenian, Croatian and, partly, Italian caves.

== Biology and ecology ==
Leptodirus hochenwartii is a true troglobite, adapted to subterranean life and unable to survive in the outside environment. As a result, it possesses typical troglobiotic features, such as elongated legs and antennae, the absence of wings, the absence of pigment in the integument, and anophthalmia (absence of eyes). However, the most striking features are the slender thorax, hence the specific name (leptos=slender, deiros=neck), and the domed elytrae which cover the abdomen completely and give the animal its peculiar round appearance. This adaptation (so-called "false physogastry") allows the animal to store wet air under its elytrae and use it for breathing in drier areas. Another typical feature is a specific receptor (the Hamann organ) on its antennae which helps the animal to perceive air humidity level.

It lives predominantly in large and cold caves where the temperature does not exceed 12 °C (54 °F). Its ecology is largely unknown, but the specimens were seen feeding on organic material, both animal and vegetable origin, which come from outside environment via percolating water or bats’ and birds’ guano, and carcasses of different cave animals. Even less is known about its life history. The only study done on L. hochenwartii so far showed that, as is the case in most specialised cave Leptodirini, females lay a small number of relatively large eggs which take a long time to develop. The number of larval instars is reduced to only one, and the larvae do not feed before moulting. The maximum period of activity of adults is still unknown. As usual in troglobites, environmental stability and the absence of sunlight have brought about the loss of circadian rhythm, whereas seasonal rhythm is affected by rainfall patterns.

== Research history ==
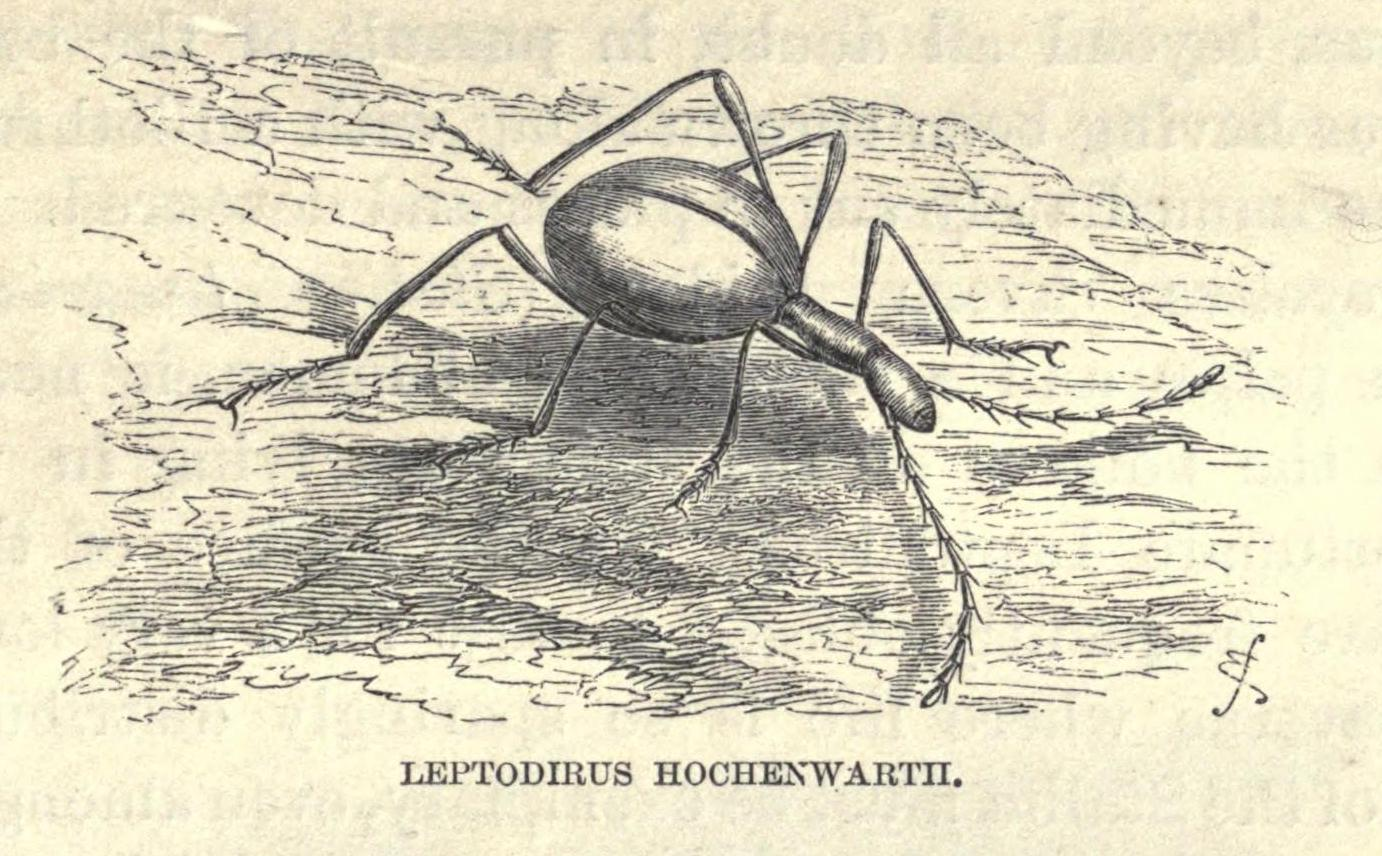
Leptodirus hochenwartii in an 1871 lithograph

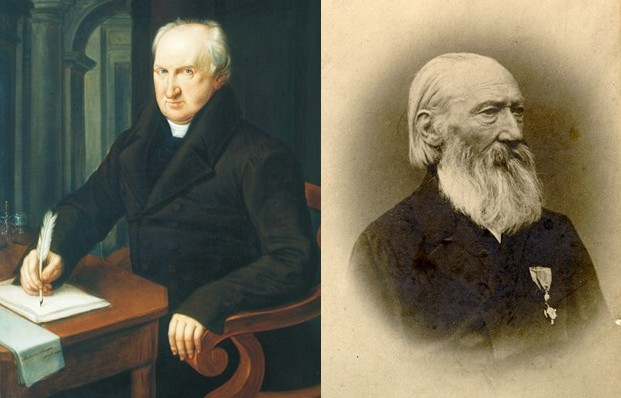
Portraits of Franz von Hochenwart and Ferdinand J. Schmidt (Ljubljana, National Museum of Slovenia).

The animal was first found in 1831 by Luka Čeč, an assistant to the lamplighter in the Postojna Cave system in southwestern Slovenia, when exploring new inner cave portions discovered some year before. He gave the specimen to count Earl Franz von Ho(c)henwart who was unable to determine the species, and gave it in turn to Ferdinand Jožef Schmidt, a naturalist and entomologist from Ljubljana. Schmidt recognized the beetle as a new species and described it in the article under the name "Beitrag zu Krain's Fauna" (Contribution to the fauna of Carniola) which appeared in the Carniolan paper Illyrisches Blatt in 1832. He named it Leptodirus (which means "slender-necked (beetle)") hochenwartii after the donor, and also gave it the common Slovene name drobnovratnik and German Enghalskäfer, both related to its typical slender thorax. The article represents the first formal description of a cave animal, since the olm (Proteus anguinus), described in 1768 by Josephus Nicolaus Laurenti, was not recognized as a cave animal at the time. In 1856 the Russian entomologist Viktor Motchoulski described a new Leptodirus species, named L. schmidti, currently recognized as a subspecies of L. hochenwartii.

Subsequent research by Schmidt and other naturalists revealed further previously unknown cave inhabitants, which aroused considerable interest among cave researchers. For this reason, the discovery of L. hochenwartii (along with the olm) is considered the starting point of biospeleology as a scientific discipline.

== Taxonomy and range ==
Approximate range of L. hochenwartii in the Dinaric Alps

Leptodirus hochenwartii is the only species in the genus Leptodirus. It is endemic to western Dinaric Alps, from Inner Carniola (Slovenia) north to Velebit (Croatia) south. Six subspecies are currently recognized in this range: (Note: The exact status of several subspecies is problematic to determine because specimens can differ significantly in physical characteristics even within the same population.)

- Leptodirus hochenwartii hochenwartii Schmidt, 1832
- Leptodirus hochenwartii schmidti (Motschoulsky, 1856)
- Leptodirus hochenwartii reticulatus J. Müller, 1906
- Leptodirus hochenwartii pretneri Müller, 1926
- Leptodirus hochenwartii croaticus Pretner, 1955
- Leptodirus hochenwartii velebiticus Pretner, 1970

Of those, two subspecies (hochenwartii and schmidti) are only found in Slovenia, and three (pretneri, croaticus and velebiticus) are only found in Croatia. The subspecies L. h. reticulatus are found in Slovenia, Croatia and in the Trieste Karst (in Italy), where was originally found in Grotta Noè.

== Conservation ==
Although IUCN has not evaluated its conservation status, due to its limited range and slow reproduction, L. hochenwartii is considered rare and vulnerable, despite the fact that individual density in some caves can be high. The main threats are illegal and massive collecting and pollution of the caves. As a consequence, the species is included in the Slovenian Red list of threatened species (category R). Additionally, it is included in the Annex II of the EU Habitats Directive (92/43/EEC). On this basis, 15 areas of conservation (pSCI) are established in Slovenia which include the majority of known localities.
