= Cave conservation =

Protection of caves to minimise the effects of human activities

Cave conservation is the protection and restoration of caves to prevent or minimise the effects of human activities.

Some caves have delicate features that can be disturbed by changes in light levels, humidity, temperature or air flow. Caves that have lighting that remains on are prone to having algae grow within the cave changing the appearance and ecology. Speleothems grow as a result of water both on cave surfaces and the humidity of the cave air. Changes to these because of a high number of visitors, changes to the cave air flow and changes to the hydrology will alter speleothem development.

Speleothems can have a slow growth rate and therefore removing them as souvenirs or breakage due to movement within the cave will be visible for a long time, often throughout several generations of human interaction.

The use of calcium carbide for lamps has led to soot marks and deposits of discarded spent carbide. Using electric lamps avoids these problems.

== Cave conservation by region ==
=== New Zealand ===
The New Zealand Speleological Society (NZSS), a recreational caving organisation, promotes cave conservation by its members. The Department of Conservation (DoC) is responsible for caves on land under its administration and has developed a management policy for caves and karst. DoC publish a "Caving care code" which is in turn based in part on the caving ethics of NZSS.

=== United Kingdom ===
The British Cave Research Association administers the United Kingdom Cave Conservation Emergency Fund (UKCCEF), a charitable fund for protection of caves and cave features. The aims are:

- To assist in the publication of material intended to promote the conservation of caves and features therein or the conservation of a specific site or group of caves
- To assist with the physical protection of features within a specific cave or group of caves
- To assist in works designed to maintain access to a cave or part of a cave, but not solely to assist exploration
- To assist in the purchase of land or property where such acquisition is intended to ensure the protection of, or maintenance of access to, a cave or caves.

The National Caving Association has a Cave Conservation Code with the following recommendations:

- Cave with care and within your abilities
- Keep to marked routes and do not cross conservation tapes and barriers
- Protect cave wildlife and do not disturb bats
- Do not pollute the cave, leave nothing behind
- Archaeological and other remains should not be disturbed
- Do not interfere with scientific equipment
- Set a good example for others to follow
- Avoid touching or damaging formations
- Take nothing but photographs
- Comply with any access requirements
- Respect the rights and privacy of landowners

=== United States ===
The National Speleological Society believes:

- Caves have unique scientific, recreational, and scenic values
- These values are endangered by both carelessness and intentional vandalism
- These values, once gone, cannot be recovered
- The responsibility for protecting caves must be formed by those who study and enjoy them.
- A common phrase on ethical caving: "Take nothing but pictures, leave nothing but footprints, waste nothing but time."

Also involved in cave conservation are the:

- Butler Cave Conservation Society
- Cave Research Foundation
- Southeastern Cave Conservancy

=== India ===
The National Cave Research and Protection Organization is formed to protect the caves and explore the caves scientifically to know them better.
