= Trogloxene =

Animals which inhabit caves periodically or accidentally

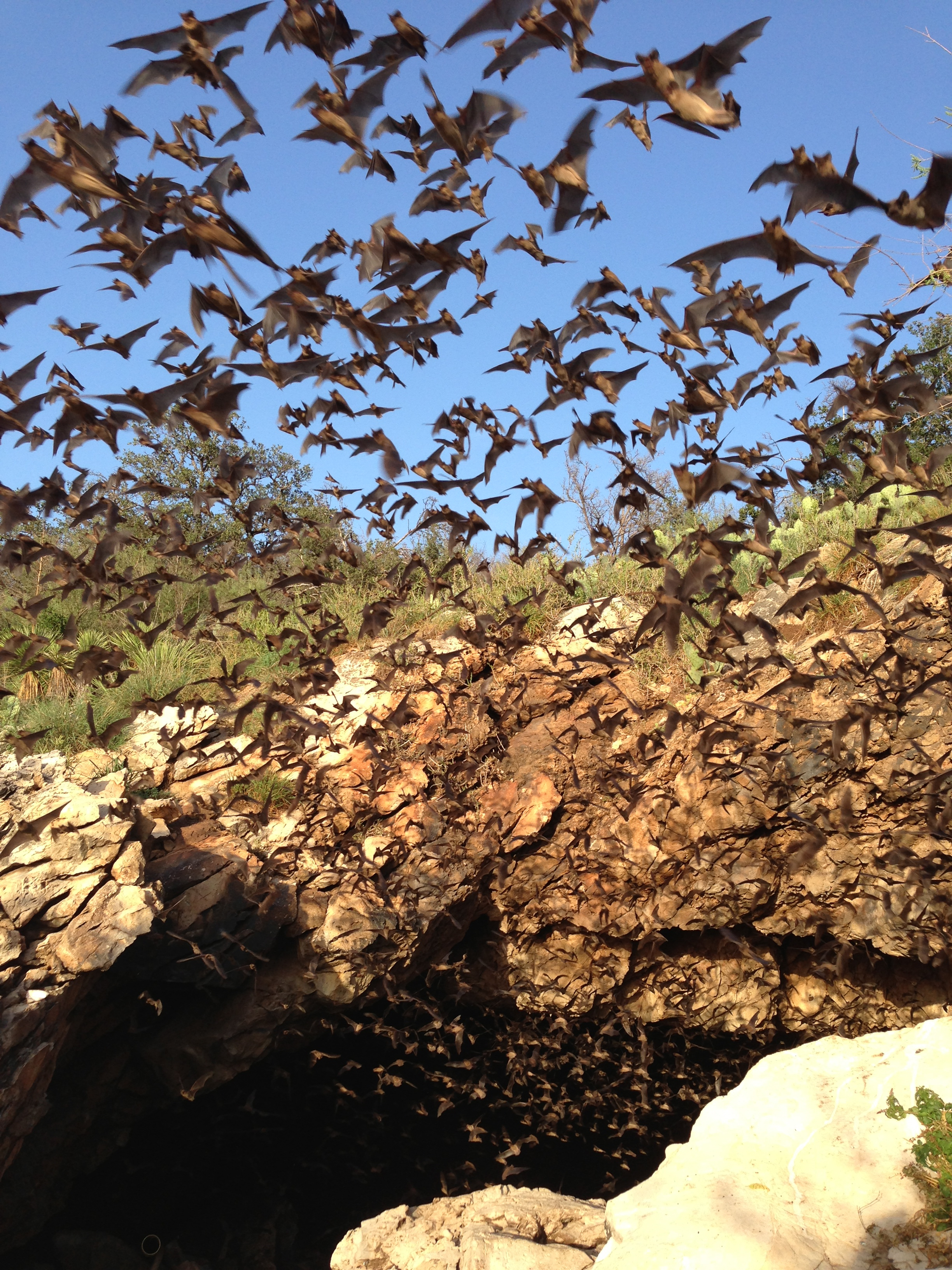
Bats emerging from a cave

Trogloxenes or subtroglophiles, also called cave guests, are animal species which periodically live in underground habitats such as caves or at the very entrance, but cannot live exclusively in such habitats. Among many scientists, trogloxenes and subtroglophile have slightly different but closely related meanings, with the former covering species that are occasional visitors to underground habitat and the latter species that live more permanently there, but have to go outside (for example, to find food). Both these are in contrast to troglobites, which strictly live in underground habitats.

Examples of trogloxene/subtroglophile species are bats, rats, raccoons and some opiliones (this last group also has fully troglobitic species). Several extinct trogloxenes are known like cave bears, cave lions, cave leopards, and cave hyenas. Indications trusted by geologists and archaeologists combine to show that these animals lived there in the latter part, at least, of the third interglacial epoch, and on through the fourth and last glacial advance, when, although central Europe was free from an ice cap, an almost Arctic climate prevailed, with much rain. This is what is known as the Upper Paleolithic when humanity in Europe was represented by the Neanderthals. During the Upper Paleolithic, many carnivores gradually adapted by increased fur and resorting far more than previously to the shelter of caves. The cave bear (Ursus spelaeus) was the most habitual in its use of caves, and occupied caves before humans began to do so.

The name Trogloxene comes from Greek, Troglos meaning cave and Xenos guest.

== See also ==
- Stygofauna
