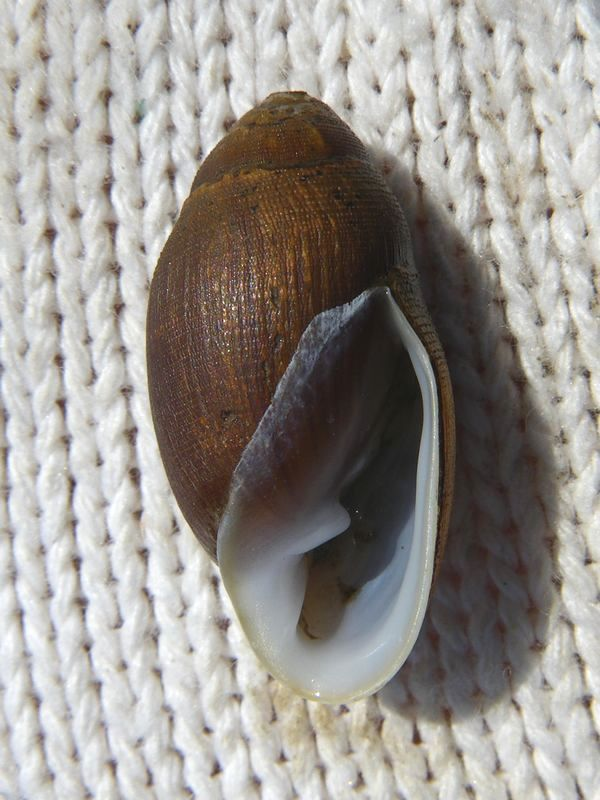
- apertural view of shell of Ellobium chinense

Scientific classification
- Kingdom: Animalia
- Phylum: Mollusca
- Class: Gastropoda
- Order: Ellobiida
- Superfamily: Ellobioidea
- Family: Ellobiidae
- Genus: Ellobium; Röding, 1798

Type species
- Ellobium midae Röding, 1798

Synonyms
- Alexia (Auricula) Lamarck, 1799; Auricula Lamarck, 1799; Auricula (Auricella) Möllendorff, 1898 (invalid: junior homonym of Auricella Jurine, 1817); Auriculina Kobelt, 1898 (invalid: junior homonym of Auriculina Grateloup, 1838; Auriculodes is a replacement name); Auriculodes Strand, 1928; Auriculus Montfort, 1810 (unjustified emendation of Auricula); Autonoe Guppy, 1868 (invalid: junior homonym of Autonoe Leach, 1852 [Bivalvia]; Autonoella Wenz, 1947, is a replacement name); Autonoella Wenz, 1947; Ellobium (Auriculodes) Strand, 1928; Ellobium (Ellobium) Röding, 1798; Geovula Swainson, 1840 (objective synonym of Ellobium)

= Ellobium =

Genus of gastropods

Ellobium is a genus of medium-sized, air-breathing, saltmarsh snails, terrestrial pulmonate gastropod mollusks in the family Ellobiidae.

Ellobium is the type genus of the family Ellobiidae.

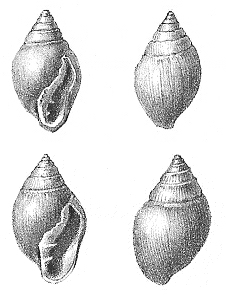
shells of Ellobium pyramidale

== Species ==
Species within the genus Ellobium include:

- Ellobium abollenense (Fontannes, 1877) †
- Ellobium aurisjudae (Linnaeus, 1758)
- Ellobium aurismidae (Linnaeus, 1758)
- Ellobium boriesi (Plaziat, 1970) †
- Ellobium chinense (Pfeiffer, 1864)
- Ellobium citharellaeforme Wenz, 1922 †
- Ellobium dominicense (Férussac, 1821)
- Ellobium gangeticum (L. Pfeiffer, 1855)
- Ellobium gaziense (Preston, 1913)
- Ellobium grateloupi (Tournouër, 1871) †
- Ellobium hanleyanum (Gassies, 1869)
- Ellobium heberti (Vasseur, 1881) †
- Ellobium incrassatum (H. Adams & A. Adams, 1854)
- Ellobium koerti Huckriede, 1967 †
- Ellobium lorteti (Fontannes, 1876) †
- Ellobium namneticum (Vasseur, 1881) †
- Ellobium oblongum (Deshayes, 1830) †
- Ellobium olivaeforme (Briart & Cornet, 1887) †
- Ellobium pontileviense (de Morgan, 1917) †
- Ellobium pyramidale Sowerby, 1822
- Ellobium requienii (Matheron, 1843) †
- Ellobium roberti (de Morgan, 1917) †
- Ellobium scheepmakeri (Petit de la Saussaye, 1850)
- Ellobium scotinum (Cossmann, 1902) †
- Ellobium semisculptum H. Adams & A. Adams, 1854
- Ellobium simplex (Cossmann, 1895) † (taxon inquirendum)
- Ellobium stagnale (d'Orbigny, 1835)
- Ellobium strangulatum (de Morgan, 1917) †
- Ellobium subjudae (A. d'Orbigny, 1852) †
- Ellobium subnodosum (Metcalfe, 1851)
- Ellobium tornatelliforme (Petit de la Saussaye, 1843)
- Ellobium vicentinum (Fuchs, 1870) †

Species brought into synonymy

- Ellobium australe Röding, 1798: synonym of Placostylus fibratus (Martyn, 1784)
- Ellobium barbadense Röding, 1798: synonym of Melampus coffea (Linnaeus, 1758)
- Ellobium dactylus (Pfeiffer, 1854): synonym of Ellobium aurisjudae (Linnaeus, 1758)
- Ellobium durlstonense Arkell, 1941 †: synonym of Juramarinula durlstonensis (Arkell, 1941) † (new combination)
- Ellobium gangetica [sic]: synonym of Ellobium gangeticum (L. Pfeiffer, 1855)
- Ellobium grande (Briart & Cornet, 1887) †: synonym of Semiauricula grandis (Briart & Cornet, 1887) † (new combination)
- Ellobium labrosum Röding, 1798: synonym of Ellobium aurisjudae (Linnaeus, 1758)
- Ellobium midae Röding, 1798: synonym of Ellobium aurismidae (Linnaeus, 1758)
- Ellobium oparicum H. Adams & A. Adams, 1854: synonym of Auriculastra oparica (H. Adams & A. Adams, 1854) (original combination)
- Ellobium semiplicatum H. Adams & A. Adams, 1854: synonym of Auriculastra semiplicata (H. Adams & A. Adams, 1854) (original combination)
- Ellobium subtile Röding, 1798: synonym of Ellobium aurisjudae (Linnaeus, 1758)
