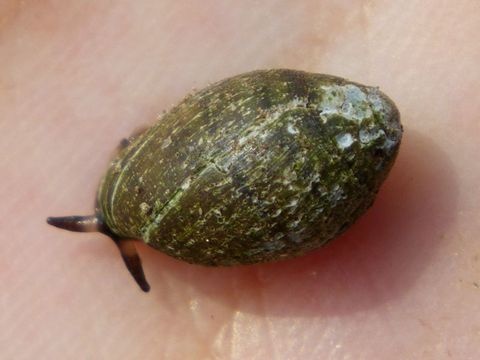
- A live Melampus sincaporensis on a human hand

Scientific classification
- Kingdom: Animalia
- Phylum: Mollusca
- Class: Gastropoda
- Order: Ellobiida
- Superfamily: Ellobioidea
- Family: Ellobiidae
- Subfamily: Melampodinae
- Genus: Melampus; Montfort, 1810

Synonyms
- Auricula (Conovulus) Lamarck, 1816; Conovulus Lamarck, 1816; Melampus (Melampus) Montfort, 1810 · accepted, alternate representation; Melampus (Micromelampus) Möllendorff, 1898 · accepted, alternate representation; Melampus (Persa) H. Adams & A. Adams, 1855· accepted, alternate representation; Melampus (Pira) H. Adams & A. Adams, 1855· accepted, alternate representation; Melampus (Signia) H. Adams & A. Adams, 1855 · accepted, alternate representation; Pira H. Adams & A. Adams, 1855; Tifata H. Adams & A. Adams, 1855; Tralia (Signia) H. Adams & A. Adams, 1855 (basionym)

= Melampus (gastropod) =

Genus of gastropods

Melampus is a genus of small air-breathing salt marsh snails, pulmonate gastropod mollusks in the family Ellobiidae.

== Species ==
Species in the genus Melampus include:

- Melampus acinoides Morelet, 1889
- Melampus adamsianus L. Pfeiffer, 1855
- † Melampus antiquus Meek, 1873
- Melampus bidentatus Say, 1822
- Melampus boholensis Pfeiffer, 1856
- Melampus bullaoides (Montagu, 1808)
- Melampus carolianus (Lesson, 1842)
- Melampus castaneus Mühlfeld, 1818
- Melampus ceylonicus (Petit de la Saussaye, 1843)
- Melampus coffea (Linnaeus, 1758)
- Melampus concretus Morelet, 1882
- Melampus cristatus Pfeiffer, 1854
- Melampus crossei de Morgan, 1885
- Melampus cumingianus (Récluz, 1846)
- Melampus exaratus H. Adams & A. Adams, 1854
- Melampus fasciatus (Deshayes, 1830)
- † Melampus feurtillensis Maillard, 1884
- Melampus flavus (Gmelin, 1791)
- Melampus flexuosus Crosse, 1867
- Melampus floridanus Pfeiffer, 1856
- Melampus granifer (Mousson, 1849)
- Melampus granum Gassies, 1869
- Melampus hypoleucus E. von Martens, 1897
- Melampus liberianus H. Adams & A. Adams, 1854
- Melampus lividus (Deshayes, 1830)
- Melampus luteus (Quoy & Gaimard, 1832)
- Melampus massauensis L. Pfeiffer, 1858
- Melampus monile (Bruguiére, 1789)
- Melampus morrisoni Martins, 1996
- Melampus mousleyi Berry, 1964
- Melampus nucleolus Martens, 1856
- Melampus nuxeastaneus Kuroda, 1949
- Melampus olivaceus Carpenter, 1857
- Melampus ovuloides Baird, 1873
- Melampus paranus (Morrison, 1951)
- Melampus parvulus Pfeiffer, 1856
- Melampus pascus Odhner, 1922
- Melampus pfeifferianus Morelet, 1860
- Melampus phaeostylus Kobelt, 1869
- Melampus philippii (Küster, 1844)
- † Melampus pilula Tournouër, 1872
- Melampus pulchellus (Petit de la Saussaye, 1843)
- Melampus quadrasi Möllendorff, 1894
- Melampus sculptus Pfeiffer, 1859
- Melampus semiaratus Connolly, 1912
- Melampus semiplicatus Pease, 1860
- Melampus semisulcatus Mousson, 1869
- Melampus sincaporensis Pfeiffer, 1855
- † Melampus sinuosus (Cossmann, 1895)
- Melampus tabogensis (C.B. Adams, 1852)
- Melampus taeniolatus
- † Melampus tenuistriatus de Morgan, 1917
- † Melampus tridentatus F. E. Edwards, 1852
- Melampus trilineatus C.B. Adams, 1852
- Melampus triticeus (Philippi, 1845)
- † Melampus turonensis (Deshayes, 1830)
- Melampus variabilis Gassies, 1863

Taxon inquirendum

- Melampus avenaceus Mousson, 1870
- Melampus brevis Gassies, 1863
- Melampus bridgesii Carpenter, 1856
- Melampus commodus H. Adams & A. Adams, 1854
- Melampus edentulus Martens, 1865
- Melampus exesus Gassies, 1874
- Melampus fuscus (Küster, 1843)
- Melampus maurus (Küster, 1844)
- Melampus mitralis H. Adams & A. Adams, 1854
- Melampus mucronatus Gould, 1852
- Melampus nitidulus H. Adams & A. Adams, 1854
- Melampus obovatus H. Adams & A. Adams, 1854
- Melampus pallescens G. B. Sowerby I, 1839 (use in recent literature currently undocumented)
- Melampus pusillus (Gmelin, 1791)
- Melampus pyriformis (Petit de la Saussaye, 1843)
- Melampus striatus Pease, 1861
- Melampus strictus Gassies, 1874
- Melampus sulculosus Martens, 1865
- † Melampus tournoueri Locard, 1878
- Melampus viola (Lesson, 1831) (synonym: Auricula viola Lesson, 1831 )
- Melampus wilkei Dohrn, 1860
- Melampus wolfii K. Miller, 1879 (status in recent literature not researched by editor)
- Melampus zealandicus H. Adams & A. Adams, 1854

Species brought into synonymy

- Subgenus Melampus (Detracia) Gray, 1840 : synonym of Detracia Gray, 1840
- Melampus acutispira Turton, 1932: synonym of Melampus parvulus Pfeiffer, 1856
- Melampus aequalis Lowe, 1832: synonym of Ovatella aequalis (Lowe, 1832)
- Melampus albus Gassies, 1865: synonym of Microtralia alba (Gassies, 1865)
- Melampus biscayensis Fischer H., 1900: synonym of Pseudomelampus exiguus (Lowe, 1832)
- Melampus caffer (Küster, 1843): synonym of Melampus lividus (Deshayes, 1830)
- Melampus canariensis Nordsieck & Talavera, 1979: synonym of Pseudomelampus exiguus (Lowe, 1832)
- Melampus ceylanicus [sic]: synonym of Melampus ceylonicus (Petit de la Saussaye, 1843)
- Melampus coffeus (Linnaeus, 1758): synonym of Melampus coffea (Linnaeus, 1758)
- Melampus exiguus Lowe, 1832: synonym of Pseudomelampus exiguus (Lowe, 1832)
- Melampus fortis Mousson, 1869: synonym of Melampus flavus (Gmelin, 1791)
- Melampus gracilis Lowe, 1832: synonym of Myosotella myosotis (Draparnaud, 1801)
- Melampus hemphillii (Dall, 1884): synonym of Sayella hemphillii (Dall, 1884)
- Melampus kuesteri (Krauss in Küster, 1843): synonym of Melampus lividus (Deshayes, 1830)
- Melampus microspira Pilsbry, 1891: synonym of Melampus coffea (Linnaeus, 1758)
- Melampus monilis (Bruguière, 1789): synonym of Melampus monile (Bruguière, 1789)
- Melampus ordinarius Melvill & Ponsonby, 1901: synonym of Melampus lividus (Deshayes, 1830)
- Melampus patulus Lowe, 1832: synonym of Melampus luteus (Quoy & Gaimard, 1832)
- Melampus siamensis Martens, 1865: synonym of Melampus sincaporensis L. Pfeiffer, 1855
- Melampus singaporensis [sic]: synonym of Melampus sincaporensis L. Pfeiffer, 1855
- Melampus stutchburyi L. Pfeiffer, 185: synonym of Ophicardelus sulcatus H. Adams & A. Adams, 1854
- Melampus sulcatus Brazier, 1877: synonym of Ophicardelus sulcatus H. Adams & A. Adams, 1854
- Melampus tetricus Morelet, 1864: synonym of Pleuroloba quoyi (H. & A. Adams, 1854)
- Melampus umlaasianus (Küster, 1843): synonym of Melampus lividus (Deshayes, 1830)
