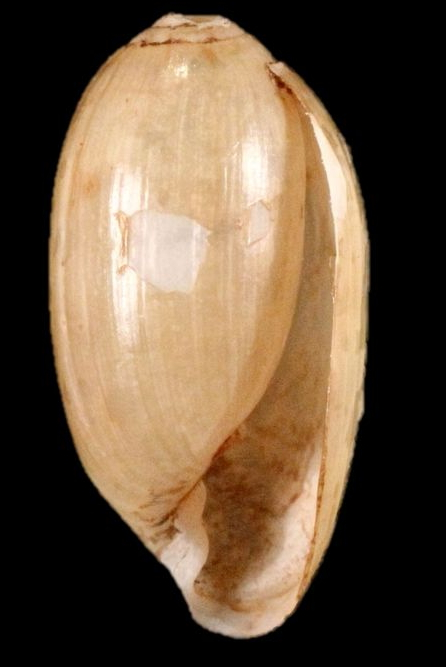
- Shell of Auriculastra siamensis (specimen in the Naturalis Biodiversity center)

Scientific classification
- Kingdom: Animalia
- Phylum: Mollusca
- Class: Gastropoda
- Order: Ellobiida
- Family: Ellobiidae
- Genus: Auriculastra
- Species: A. siamensis

Binomial name
- Auriculastra siamensis (Brandt, 1974)

Synonyms
- Cylindrotis siamensis R. A. Brandt, 1974 superseded combination

= Auriculastra siamensis =

Species of gastropod

Auriculastra siamensis is a species of air-breathing land snail, a terrestrial gastropod mollusc in the family Ellobiidae, the salt marsh snails.

== Description ==
The length of the shell attains 4.25 mm, its diameter 2 mm.

== Distribution ==
This species occurs in Thailand and Singapore.
