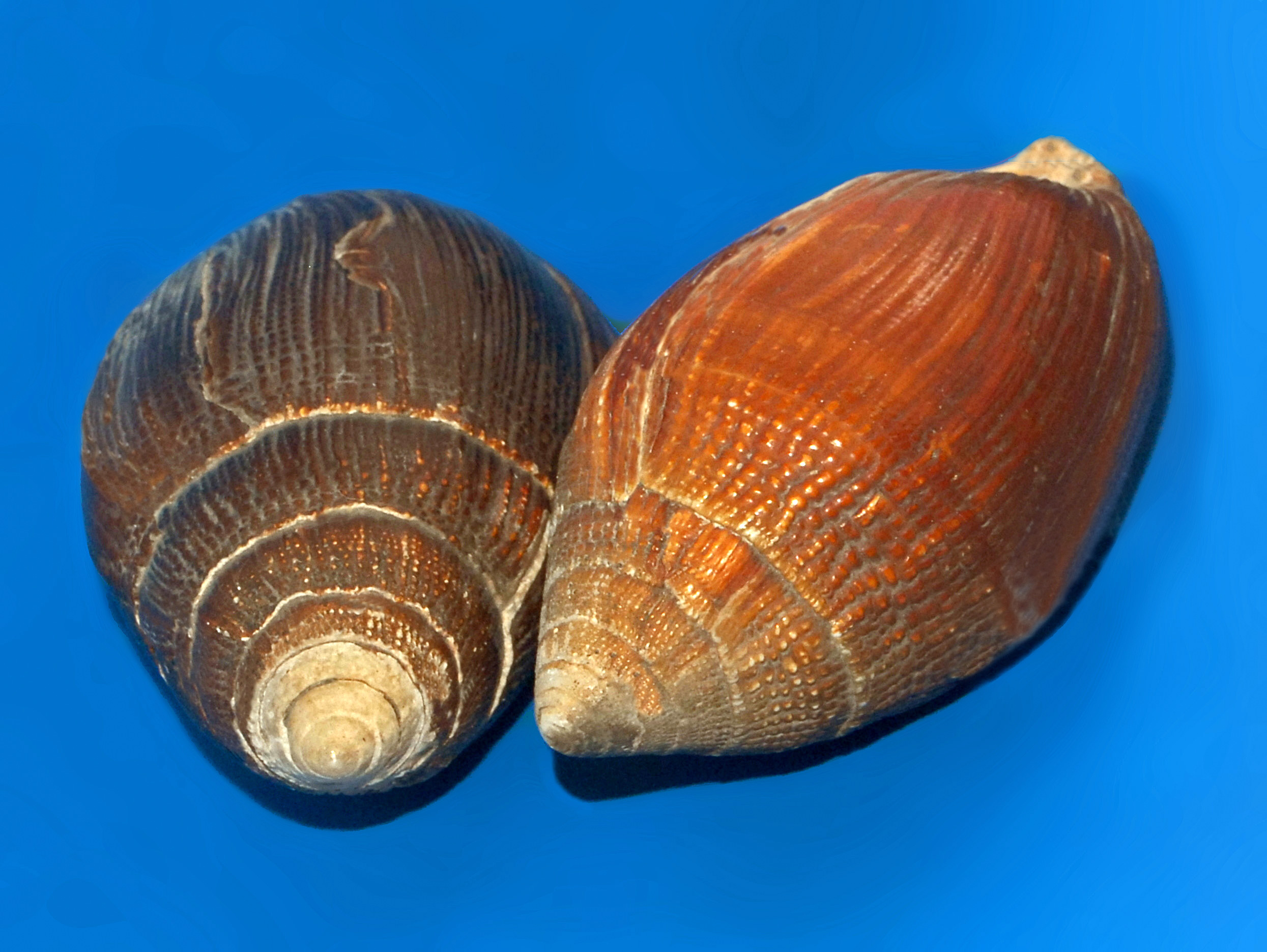
- Shells of Ellobium aurismidae from Bangka Island (left) and New Guinea (right) at the Museo Civico di Storia Naturale di Milano

Scientific classification
- Kingdom: Animalia
- Phylum: Mollusca
- Class: Gastropoda
- Order: Ellobiida
- Family: Ellobiidae
- Genus: Ellobium
- Species: E. aurismidae

Binomial name
- Ellobium aurismidae (Linnaeus, 1758)

= Ellobium aurismidae =

Species of gastropod

Ellobium aurismidae, common name Midas's ear shell, is a species of medium-sized, air-breathing, saltmarsh snails, terrestrial pulmonate gastropod mollusks in the family Ellobiidae.

== Distribution ==
This species can be found in the Southwest-Pacific from China and Philippines to Indonesia, Peninsular Malaysia, Singapore and in the Australian states of Northern Territory and Queensland.

== Description ==
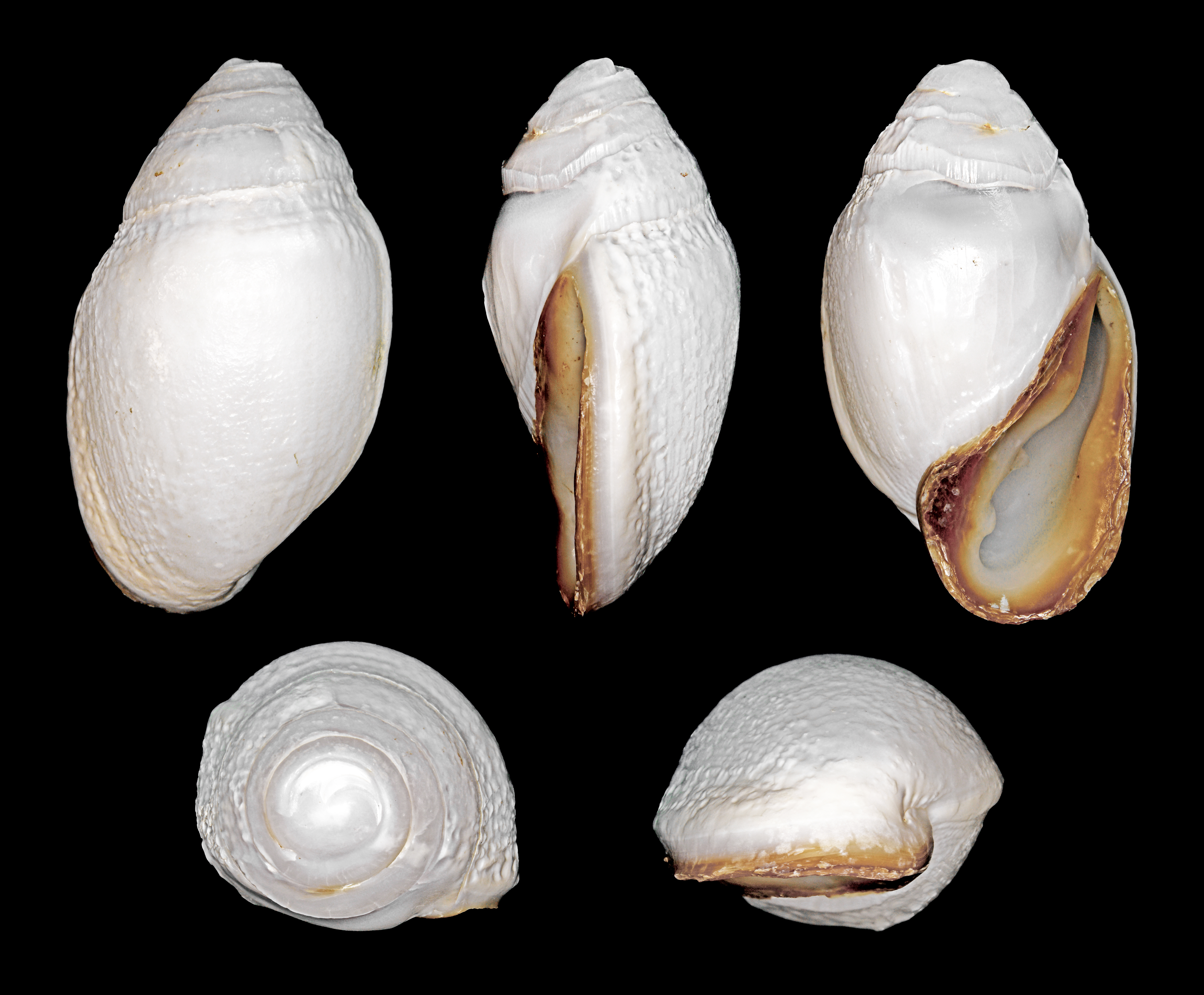
Ellobium aurismidae shell.

Ellobium aurismidae is one of the largest members of the family. It has a shell reaching a size of 60 – 98 mm. The surface of this shell is usually brown or dark brown, but may also be white. The interior of the shell is white. The body of the animal is brown in colour.

== Habitat ==
These hollow-shelled snails live in mud flats with vegetation, in mangrove swamps and salt marshes, but preferably away from direct contact with sea water.
