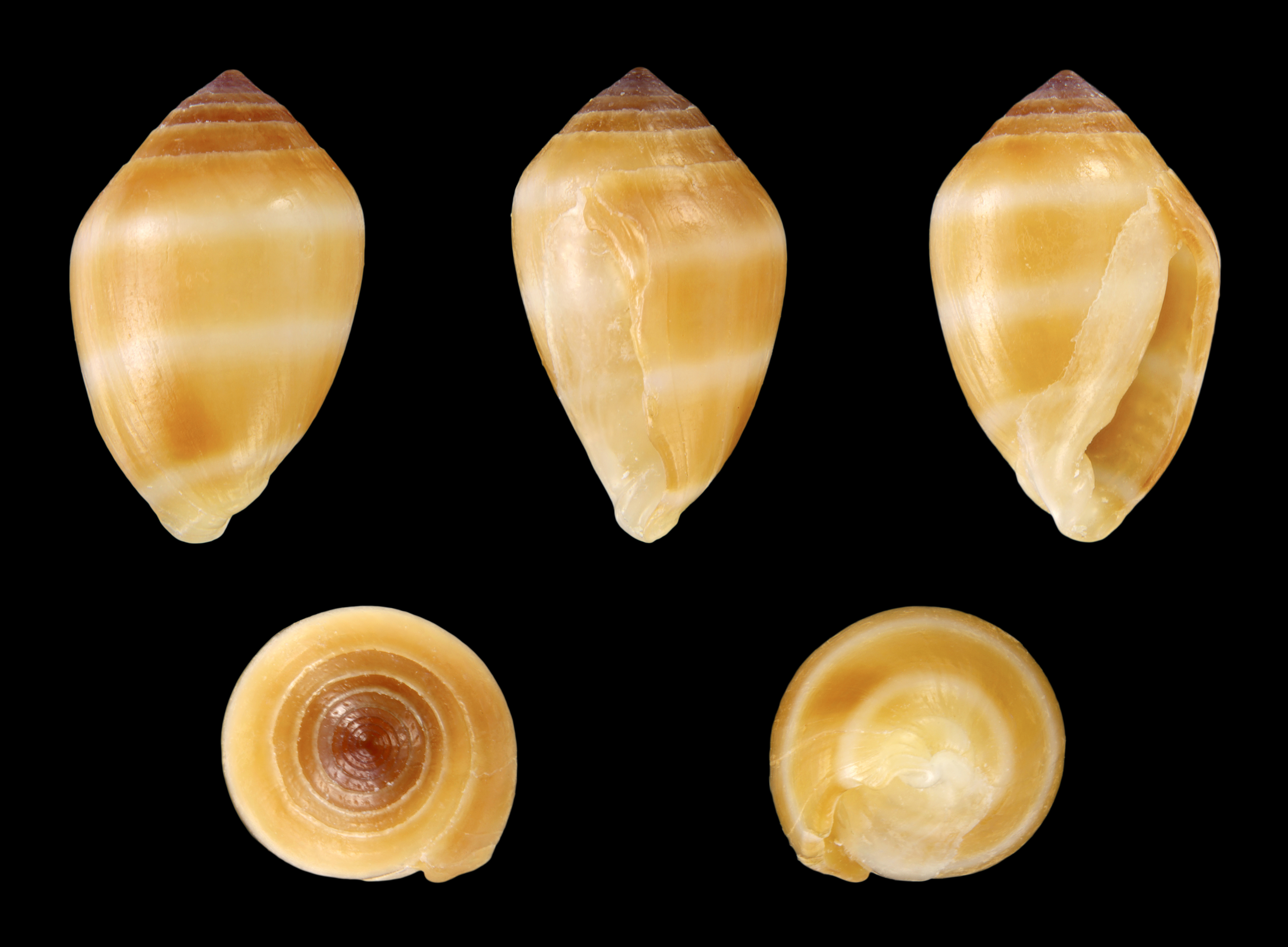

Scientific classification
- Kingdom: Animalia
- Phylum: Mollusca
- Class: Gastropoda
- Order: Ellobiida
- Family: Ellobiidae
- Genus: Melampus
- Species: M. coffea

Binomial name
- Melampus coffea Linnaeus, 1758

Synonyms
- Auricula biplicata Deshayes, 1830; Auricula coniformis (Bruguière, 1789); Auricula olivula Küster, 1844; Bulimus coniformis Bruguière, 1789; Bulla coffea Linnaeus, 1758 (original combination); Ellobium barbadense Röding, 1798; Melampus coffeus [sic] (misspelling); Melampus microspira Pilsbry, 1891; Voluta coffea (Linnaeus, 1758, 1758)

= Melampus coffea =

Species of gastropod

Melampus coffea, commonly known as the coffee bean snail, is a species of small air-breathing salt marsh snail, a pulmonate gastropod mollusk in the family Ellobiidae.

== Distribution ==
The coffee bean snail is found on both coasts of Florida and throughout the Caribbean.

== Description ==
The maximum recorded shell length is 23 mm.

== Ecology ==
Minimum recorded depth is -0.3 m. Maximum recorded depth is 0.3 m.

This small snail is commonly found in the intertidal zone of mangroves amongst the roots and branches. It is similar in appearance to Melampus bidentatus and the two are often confused. Melampus bidentatus is slightly larger and is more likely to be found in a salt marsh as opposed to mangrove habitat for Melampus coffea.

Like other species of Melampus, the coffee bean snail is one of the few pulmonate snails to reproduce via planktonic larvae called veligers (Ruppert & Barnes 1994). Upon hatching, the veligers will spend between 4–6 weeks in the plankton, and then return to the mangroves on a high tide, and metamorphose into juvenile snails.

This species is a detritivore and herbivore, foraging upon fresh and decaying mangrove leaf litter. The coffee bean snail engages in vertical migration leading up to the time of high tide, in order to escape inundation and the increased risk of predation by various fish species.
