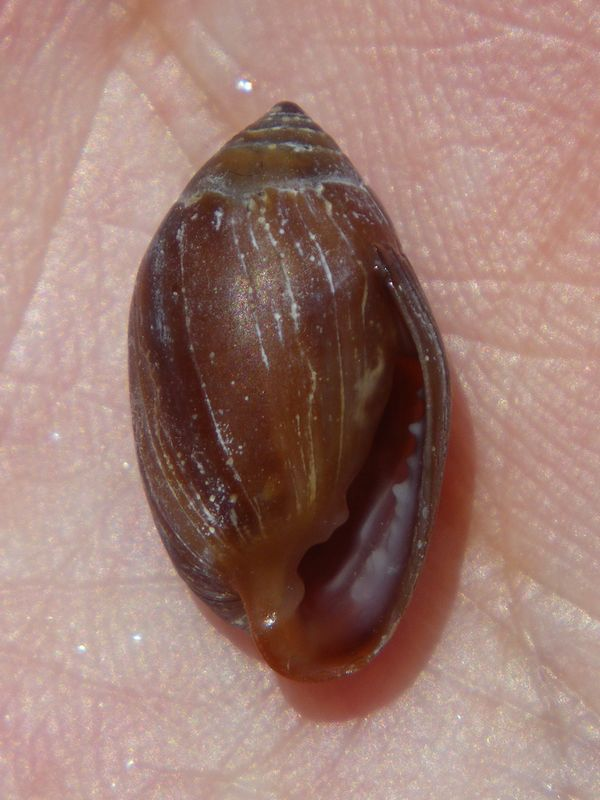
- A shell of Melampus nuxeastaneus on a human hand

Scientific classification
- Kingdom: Animalia
- Phylum: Mollusca
- Class: Gastropoda
- Order: Ellobiida
- Family: Ellobiidae
- Genus: Melampus
- Species: M. nuxeastaneus

Binomial name
- Melampus nuxeastaneus Kuroda, 1949

= Melampus nuxeastaneus =

Species of gastropod

Melampus nuxeastaneus is a species of small air-breathing salt marsh snail, a pulmonate gastropod mollusk in the family Ellobiidae.

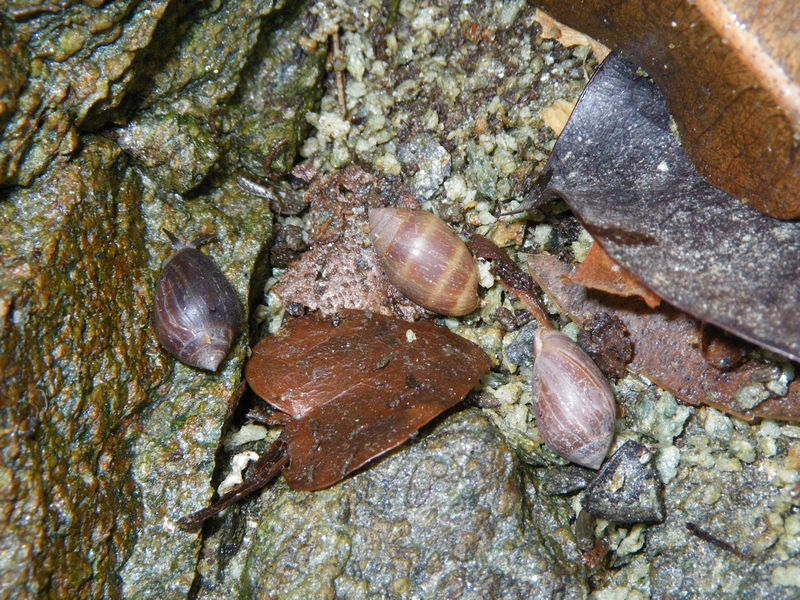
One live individual and two shells of Melampus nuxeastaneus.

== Distribution ==
The distribution of this species include:

- Japan
- Pratas Island, Taiwan
