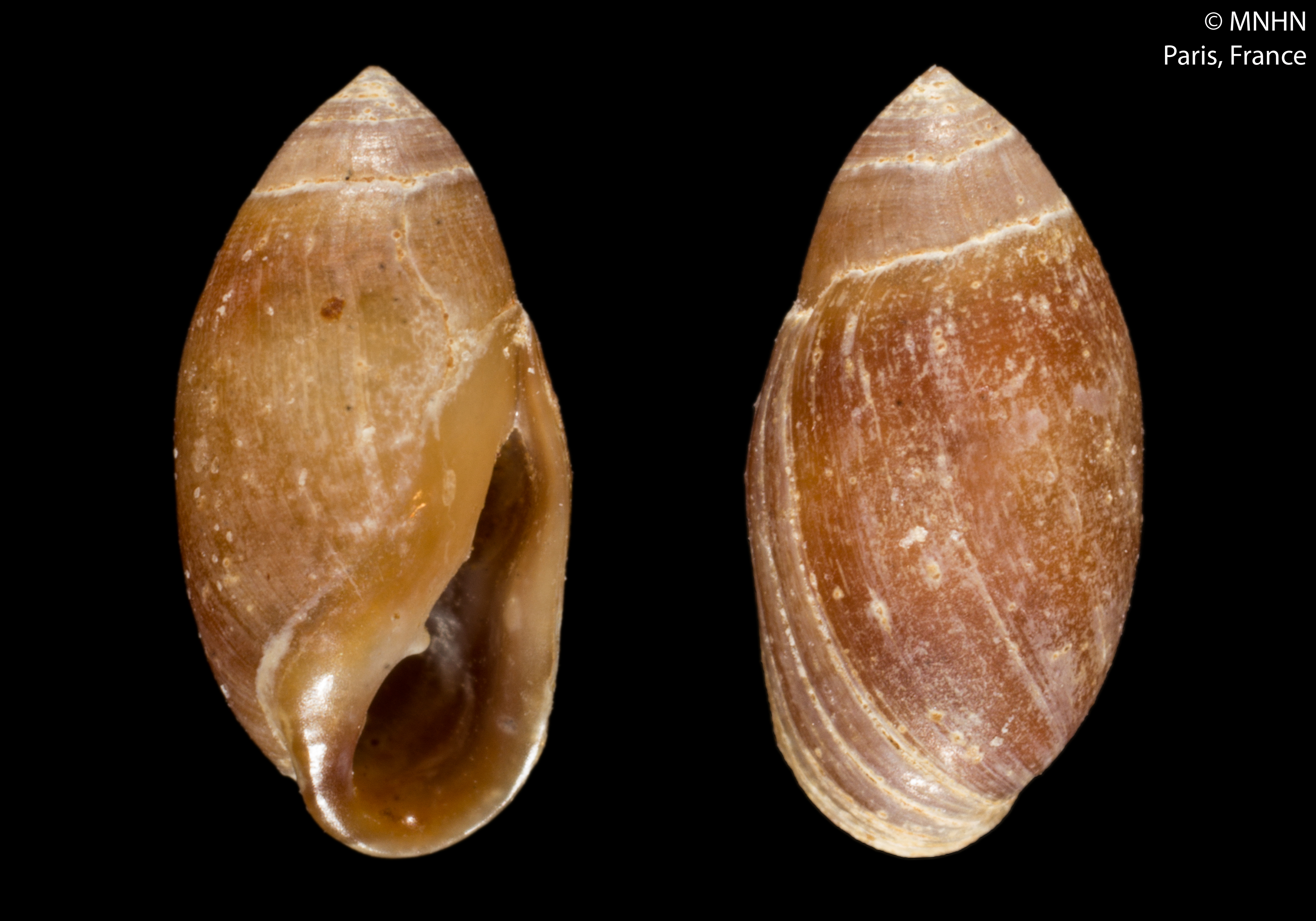
- Shell of Auriculastra gassiesi (syntype at MNHN, Paris)

Scientific classification
- Kingdom: Animalia
- Phylum: Mollusca
- Class: Gastropoda
- Order: Ellobiida
- Family: Ellobiidae
- Genus: Auriculastra
- Species: A. gassiesi

Binomial name
- Auriculastra gassiesi (Morelet, 1882)

Synonyms
- Auricula gassiesi Morelet, 1882 superseded combination

= Auriculastra gassiesi =

Species of gastropod

Auriculastra gassiesi is a species of air-breathing land snail, a terrestrial gastropod mollusc in the family Ellobiidae, the salt marsh snails.

== Description ==
The length of the shell attains 5.5 mm, its diameter 2.5 mm.

(Original description in Latin) The shell is small, imperforate (lacking an opening at the base), and spindle-shaped; it is relatively solid, smooth, shiny, and yellow-brown in color with a single chestnut-colored band. The spire is mammillated with a fine, sharp point at the apex and is somewhat brownish. It consists of seven nearly flat whorls joined by a linear suture; the body whorl slightly exceeds the spire in height and is rounded at its base. The aperture is vertical and shaped like a narrow, pointed oval; inside, it is generally a chestnut-brown and features three folds. Two of these are parietal folds—the upper one is quite small and barely visible, while the other is horizontal and strong; the third is a smaller columellar fold, which in most specimens extends all the way to the margin. The peristome (the lip of the aperture) is blunt, thick, and blackish-chestnut, with the right margin being slightly wavy.

== Distribution ==
This species occurs at the coast of Madagascar and the Comores.
