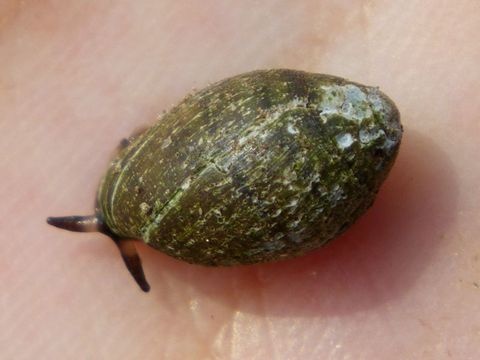
- A live Melampus sincaporensis on a human hand

Scientific classification
- Kingdom: Animalia
- Phylum: Mollusca
- Class: Gastropoda
- Order: Ellobiida
- Family: Ellobiidae
- Genus: Melampus
- Species: M. sincaporensis

Binomial name
- Melampus sincaporensis Pfeiffer, 1855

Synonyms
- Melampus singaporensis [sic] (misspelling)

= Melampus sincaporensis =

Species of gastropod

Melampus sincaporensis is a species of small air-breathing salt marsh snail, a pulmonate gastropod mollusk in the family Ellobiidae.

== Distribution ==
The distribution of this species includes Japan and India.

The conservation status of Melampus sincaporensis in Japan is vulnerable.

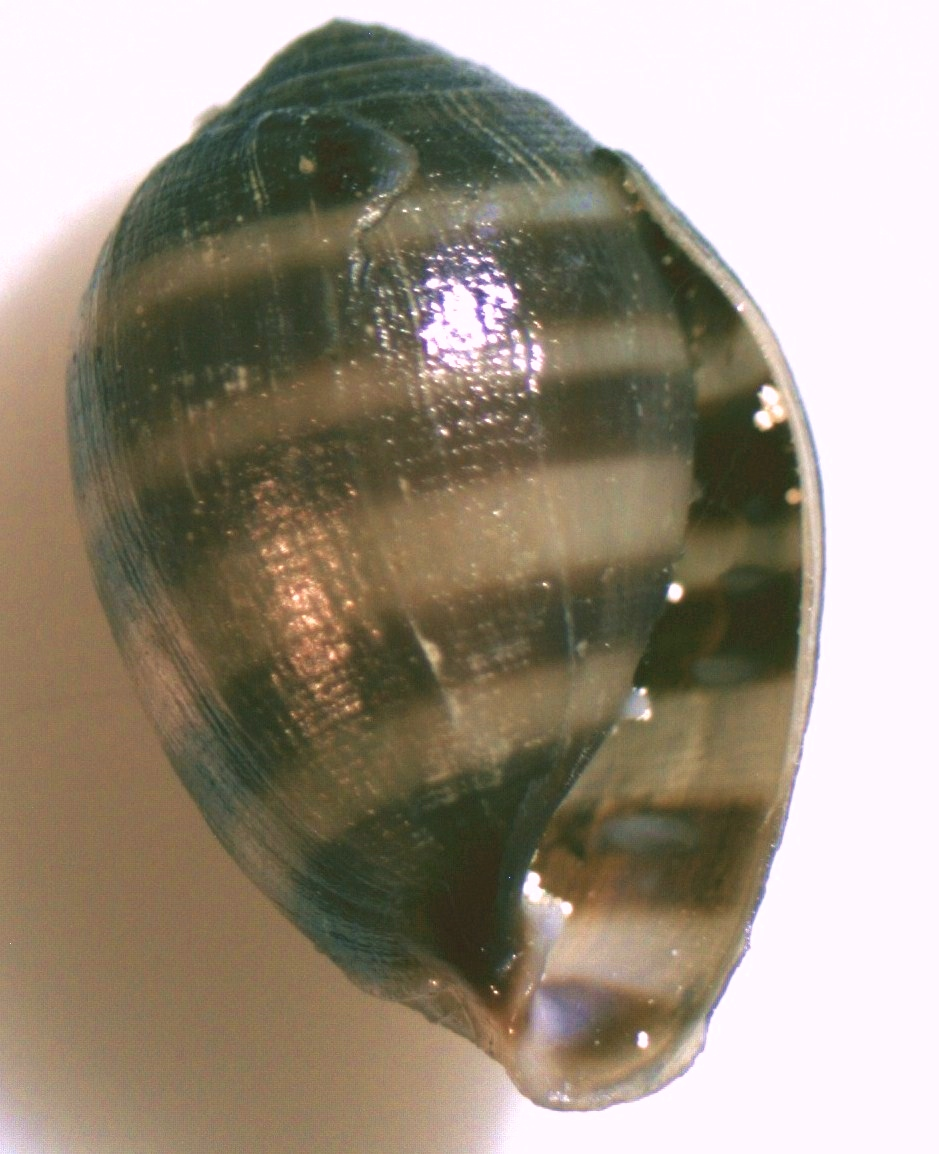
Melampus sincaporensis

== Description ==
The size of an adult shell varies between 5 mm and 10 mm.
