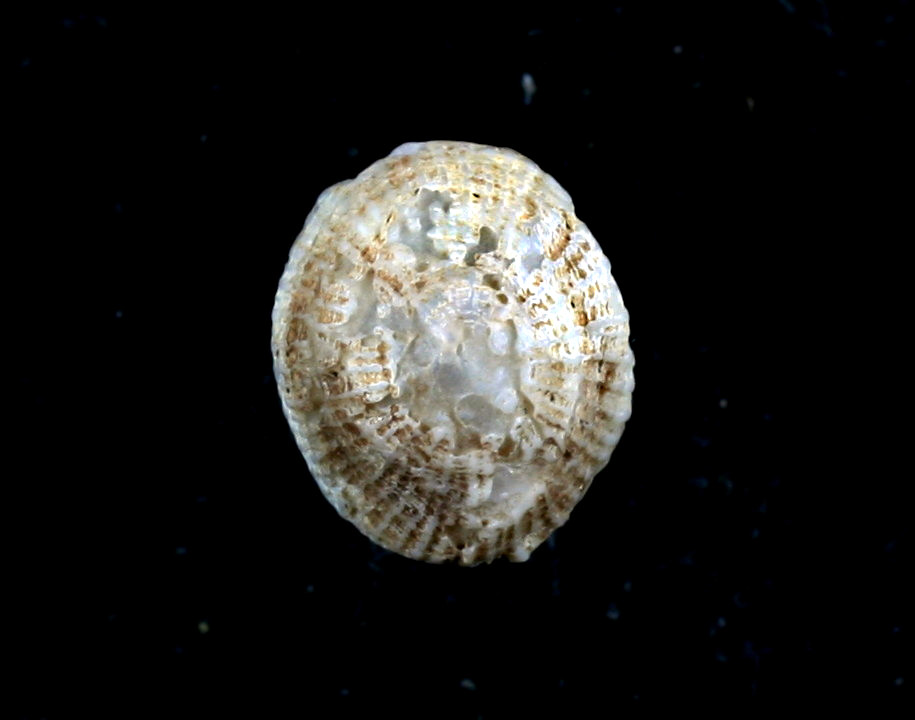

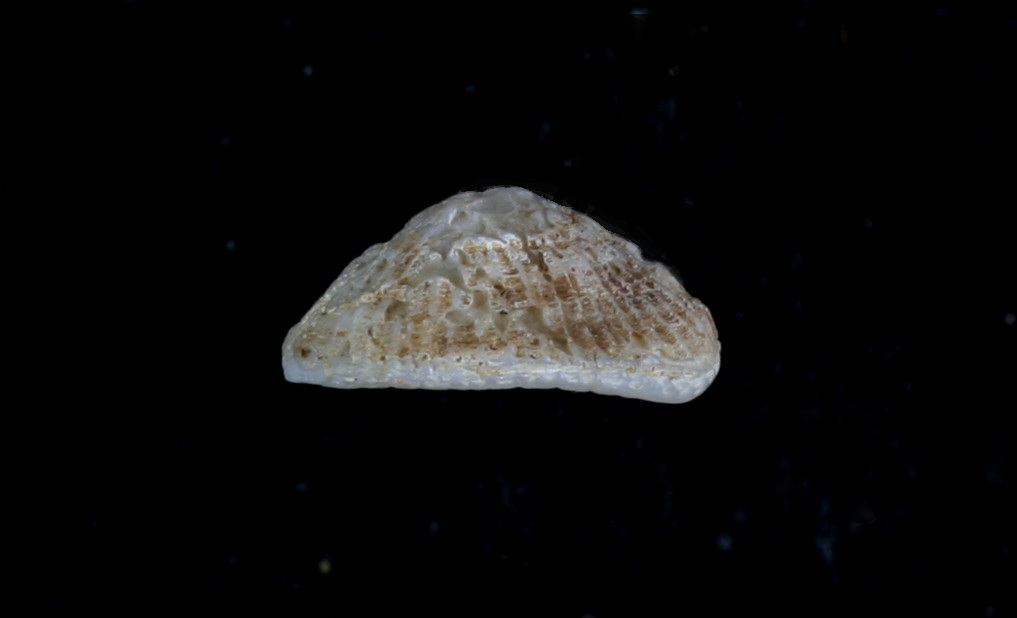
- Dorsal (top) and profile (bottom) views

Scientific classification
- Kingdom: Animalia
- Phylum: Mollusca
- Class: Gastropoda
- Order: Ellobiida
- Family: Trimusculidae
- Genus: Trimusculus
- Species: T. reticulatus

Binomial name
- Trimusculus reticulatus (Sowerby II, 1835)

= Trimusculus reticulatus =

Species of mollusc

Trimusculus reticulatus is a species of small air-breathing sea snail or false limpet, a pulmonate gastropod mollusc in the family Trimusculidae, the button snails.

Defense mechanism Trimusculus reticulatus is a false limpet, that has a chemical defense which helps it avoid being eaten by seastars like Pisaster ochraceus and P. giganteus. When a seastar tries to attack, it releases a thick, milky white mucus that disrupts the seastars tube feet, making it harder for the predator to grip and eat it. This mucus does not harm the seastar but slows down its attack long enough for the limpet to stay safe. This defense only works on seastars. It does not affect other predators like crabs which can catch and eat the limpet with no issue. Researchers tested Trimusculus reticulatus defense by coating other limpets with its mucus, and seastars avoided those limpets just as they avoided Trimusculus reticulatus.
