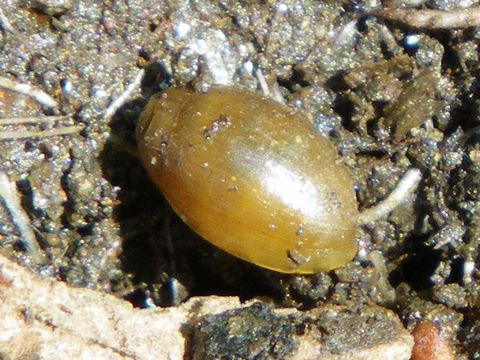
- Auriculastra duplicata, in this image only the shell is visible

Scientific classification
- Kingdom: Animalia
- Phylum: Mollusca
- Class: Gastropoda
- Order: Ellobiida
- Family: Ellobiidae
- Genus: Auriculastra
- Species: A. duplicata

Binomial name
- Auriculastra duplicata (Pfeiffer, 1854)

Synonyms
- Melampus duplicatus L. Pfeiffer, 1854 (original combination)

= Auriculastra duplicata =

Species of gastropod

Auriculastra duplicata is a species of air-breathing land snail, a terrestrial gastropod mollusc in the family Ellobiidae, the salt marsh snails.

== Description ==
(Original description in Latin) The shell is imperforate, oblong, and solid, and is arcuately striated; beneath the deciduous epidermis it is greenish-tawny to white. The spire is short, conical, and somewhat blunt; the suture is obsolete (indistinct). The 5 - 6 whorls are contiguous; the body whorl forms the greater part of the length, is inflated above the middle, and is slightly attenuated at the base. The aperture is vertical and semi-elliptical, and is canaliculated at the base. The apertural wall is furnished with a nodiform callus and, below it, with a transverse, lamella-like fold. The columella shows two oblique, parallel folds. The peristome is simple, with the right margin slightly arched and somewhat callous within.

== Distribution ==
This species occurs in the Philippines and Korea; it also occurs in Japan in Honshū, Kyūshū and Shikoku. It is considered to be a vulnerable species in Japan, in Okinawa Prefecture.
