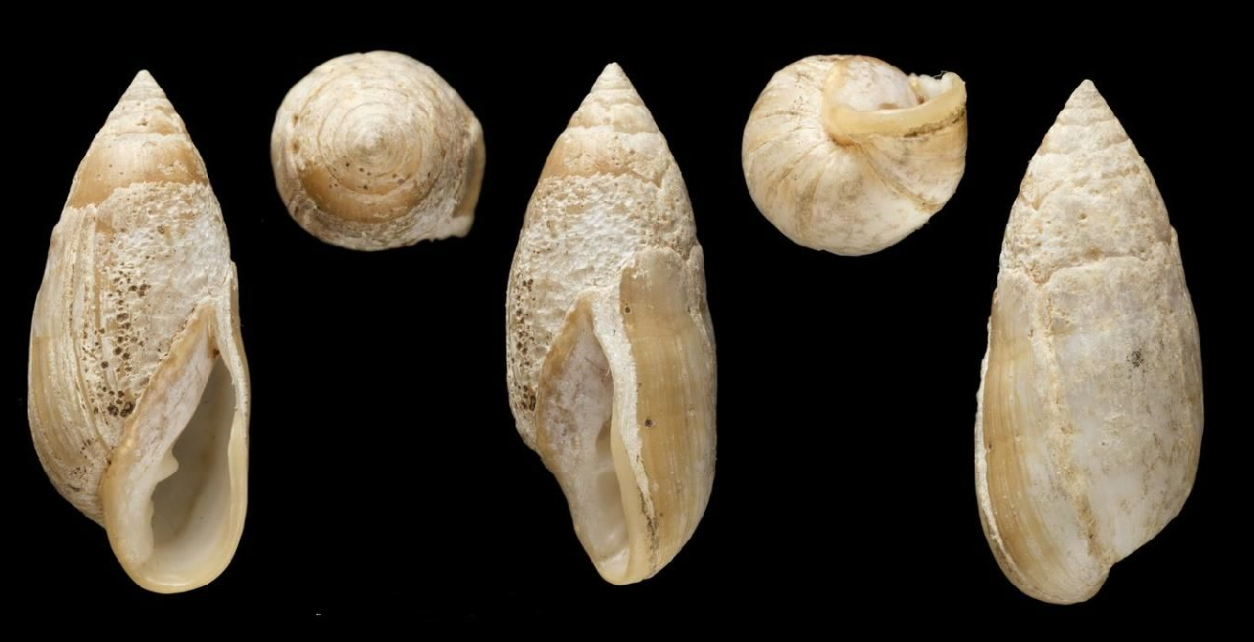
- Shell of Auriculastra saccata (specimen in the Natural History Museum, London)

Scientific classification
- Kingdom: Animalia
- Phylum: Mollusca
- Class: Gastropoda
- Order: Ellobiida
- Family: Ellobiidae
- Genus: Auriculastra
- Species: A. saccata

Binomial name
- Auriculastra saccata (Pfeiffer, 1855)

Synonyms
- Auricula saccata L. Pfeiffer, 1855 superseded combination

= Auriculastra saccata =

Species of gastropod

Auriculastra saccata is a species of air-breathing land snail, a terrestrial gastropod mollusc in the family Ellobiidae, the salt marsh snails.

== Description ==
The length of the shell attains 14 mm, its diameter 6 mm.

(Original description in Latin) The shell is shortly and deeply rimate (having a narrow slit-like opening). It is club-shaped and solid. It is finely striated, somewhat glossy, and displays a brownish-yellow hue, though the surface is irregularly eroded. The spire is elongated-conic with a sharp apex. The suture is flat and appears "torn" or jagged.

There are 8 to 9 flat whorls; the body whorl is nearly equal to the spire in length, widening toward the bottom and becoming sac-like at the base. The aperture is vertical and narrowly oval. Inside, there is a single, very small parietal fold located in the middle and set slightly crosswise. The columellar fold is faintly "double-toothed" or bidenticulate, though this feature is nearly obsolete. The peristome (the rim of the mouth) is blunt; its right margin is curved or sinuated at the top and thickened in the middle, while the columellar margin is dilated, callous, and spreading outward.

== Distribution ==
This species occurs in the Philippines, Indonesia and Japan.
