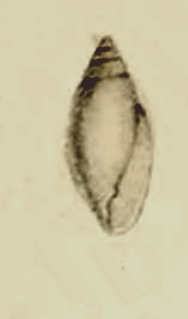
- Original drawing of a shell of Auriculastra hyalina

Scientific classification
- Kingdom: Animalia
- Phylum: Mollusca
- Class: Gastropoda
- Order: Ellobiida
- Family: Ellobiidae
- Genus: Auriculastra
- Species: A. hyalina

Binomial name
- Auriculastra hyalina (Morelet, 1883)

Synonyms
- Melampus hyalinus Morelet, 1883 superseded combination; Microtralia hyalina (Morelet, 1883)

= Auriculastra hyalina =

Species of gastropod

Auriculastra hyalina is a species of air-breathing land snail, a terrestrial gastropod mollusc in the family Ellobiidae, the salt marsh snails.

== Description ==
The length of the shell attains 3 mm, its diameter 1.5 mm.

(Original description in Latin) The imperforate shell is very small and has an ovate-spindle shape; it is thin, shiny, translucent (hyaline), and smooth. The spire is briefly conical with a somewhat sharp apex. It consists of six slightly convex whorls, with the body whorl being tapered at the base and equaling two-thirds of the total length. The suture is only slightly impressed. The aperture is narrow and features two folds: one parietal fold that is sharp and prominent, and another smaller, ascending fold located at the columella. The peristome is straight and thin, with the right margin being slightly dilated in the middle and lacking any teeth.

== Distribution ==
This species occurs at the coast of Mayotte, northern part of the Mozambique Channel.
