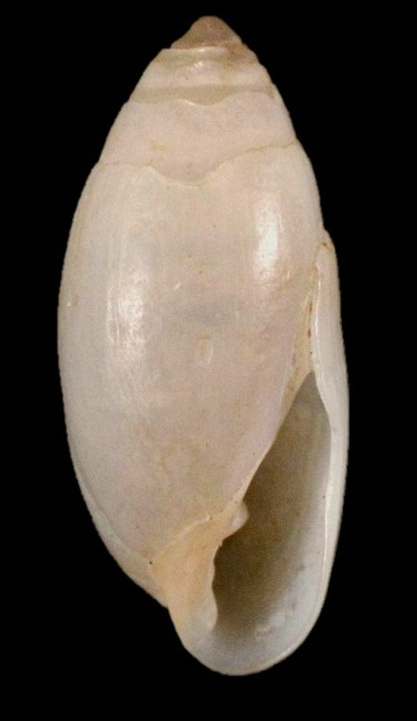
- Shell of Auriculastra pusilla (specimen at Naturalis Biodiversity center)

Scientific classification
- Kingdom: Animalia
- Phylum: Mollusca
- Class: Gastropoda
- Order: Ellobiida
- Superfamily: Ellobioidea
- Family: Ellobiidae
- Genus: Auriculastra
- Species: A. pusilla

Binomial name
- Auriculastra pusilla (H. Adams & A. Adams, 1854)

Synonyms
- Ellobium pusillum H. Adams & A. Adams, 1854 (original combination)

= Auriculastra pusilla =

Species of gastropod

Auriculastra pusilla is a species of air-breathing land snail, a terrestrial gastropod mollusc in the family Ellobiidae, the salt marsh snails.

== Description ==
The length of the shell attains 3 mm, its diameter 1.5 mm.

(Original description in Latin) The white shell is subulate-ovate, shining and smooth. The spire is elongated with a sharp apex. The aperture is oblong and narrow. The columella is somewhat callous and bears three folds: the posterior fold is strong, while the anterior folds are small and oblique. The outer lip has a slightly thickened margin and is scarcely sinuated at the back.

== Distribution ==
This species occurs off the Philippines, Indonesia and India.
