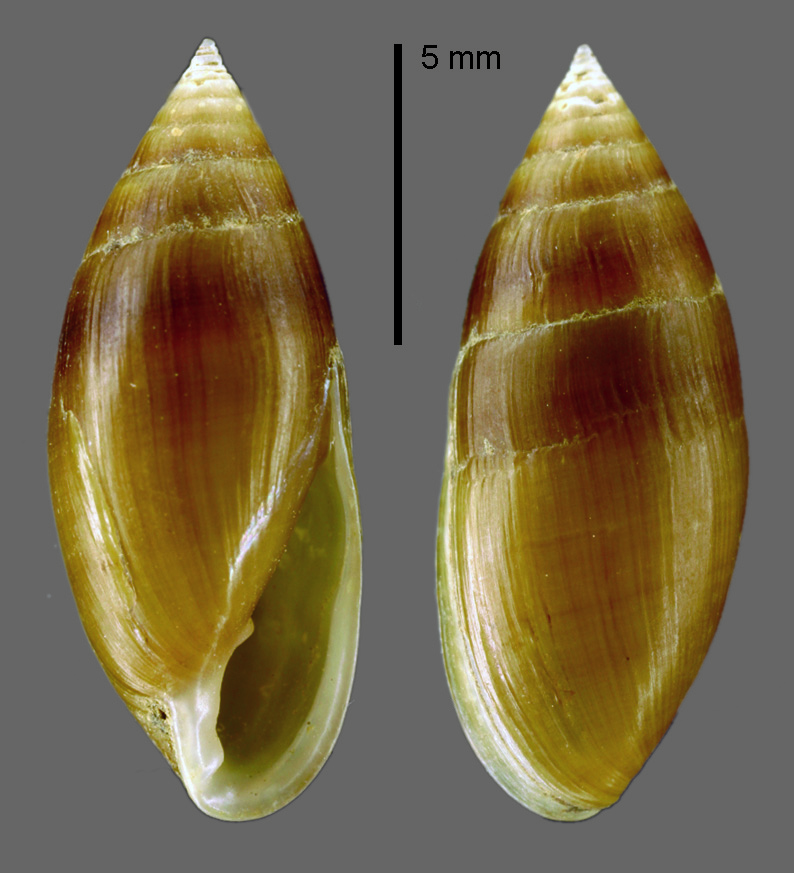
- Shell of Auriculastra subula (specimen at MNHN, Paris))

Scientific classification
- Kingdom: Animalia
- Phylum: Mollusca
- Class: Gastropoda
- Order: Ellobiida
- Family: Ellobiidae
- Genus: Auriculastra
- Species: A. subula

Binomial name
- Auriculastra subula (Quoy & Gaimard, 1832)

Synonyms
- Auricula dunkeri L. Pfeiffer, 1853; Auricula subula Quoy & Gaimard, 1832 (original combination); Ellobium subula (Quoy & Gaimard, 1832) superseded combination; Marinula (Auriculastra) subula (Quoy & Gaimard, 1832) (unaccepted combination)

= Auriculastra subula =

Species of gastropod

Auriculastra subula is a species of air-breathing land snail, a terrestrial gastropod mollusc in the family Ellobiidae, the salt marsh snails.

== Description ==
The length of the shell attains 20 mm, its diameter 7.5 mm.

(Described in Latin as Auricula dunkeri) The shell is imperforate and fusiform-oblong, possessing a solid structure that is smooth to the touch and marked only by very light longitudinal striations. It is covered in a tawny, horn-colored epidermis. The spire is convex-conic with a sharp apex, and the suture is linear and slightly jagged.

There are approximately eight whorls that are relatively flat; however, the upper whorls are irregularly eroded. The body whorl is quite large, equaling nearly two-thirds of the total shell length, and it tapers slightly at the base. The aperture is positioned nearly vertically and is narrowly semi-oval in shape.

The columella is slightly twisted and folded. The apertural wall is armed with two features: a moderate, oblique fold situated below the middle, and a second, nearly obsolete fold located near the columella. The peristome is sharp but slightly thickened on the inside; its columellar margin is scarcely dilated, reflected, and fused to the body of the shell.

== Distribution ==
This species was originally found in New Ireland Province, Papua New Guinea; its occurs widely in Southeast Asia, the Philippines, Indonesia, Australia and Japan.
