= Pyramidale =

Pyramidale may refer to:

- Ellobium pyramidale a species of small, air-breathing, saltmarsh snail, a terrestrial pulmonate gastropod mollusk in the family Ellobiidae
- Ochroma pyramidale, commonly known as the balsa tree
- Triquetral bone, also known by the Latin term os pyramidale
