= Auriculastra acuta =

Scientific classification
- Kingdom: Animalia
- Phylum: Mollusca
- Class: Gastropoda
- Order: Ellobiida
- Family: Ellobiidae
- Genus: Auriculastra
- Species: A. acuta

Binomial name
- Auriculastra acuta Connolly, 1922

Species of gastropod

Auriculastra acuta is a species of air-breathing land snail, a terrestrial gastropod mollusc in the family Ellobiidae, the salt marsh snails.

== Description ==
The length of the shell attains 17.8 mm, its diameter 8 mm.

(Original description) The shell is of fair size, fusiform, imperforate, and rather solid. In the type specimen it is bleached white and dull, but in fresh condition it is probably glossy and creamy-olivaceous. The spire is somewhat produced, with straight sides that meet at an angle of about 48°; the apex is acute. The seven whorls are almost flat, and regularly increasing, each being about one-third greater in height than its predecessor. They are sculptured with very faint, close, regular, almost straight transverse striae. The suture is extremely shallow and is strongly margined below. The aperture is inversely elongate-auriform, very acute at the apex and narrowly rounded at the base. The outer lip is simple, blunt, and gently outcurved, and is straight in profile. The columella is calloused, short, and straight, and is furnished with two deeply entering folds, of which the upper is by far the more prominent.

== Distribution ==
This species occurs at the coast of Mozambique.
