= Auriculastra quadrasi =

Scientific classification
- Kingdom: Animalia
- Phylum: Mollusca
- Class: Gastropoda
- Order: Ellobiida
- Superfamily: Ellobioidea
- Family: Ellobiidae
- Genus: Auriculastra
- Species: A. quadrasi

Binomial name
- Auriculastra quadrasi (Möllendorff, 1895)

Synonyms
- Auricula quadrasi Möllendorff, 1895 (original combination)

Species of gastropod

Auriculastra quadrasi is a species of air-breathing land snail, a terrestrial gastropod mollusc in the family Ellobiidae, the salt marsh snails.

== Description ==
The length of the shell attains 3 mm, its diameter 1.5 mm.

(Original description in Latin) The shell is not fissured, somewhat cylindrical-fusiform in shape, thin, and delicately striated, with a dull surface of a pale olive color. The spire is fairly elevated, with somewhat convex sides, and ends in a slightly mucronate, sharp apex.

There are nine whorls, which are flat and distinctly separated by an appressed, somewhat torn suture; the body whorl equals or exceeds three-fifths of the total height, descending gradually and becoming somewhat sac-like at the base.

The aperture is slightly oblique and narrowly oval. The peristome is straight above, but somewhat expanded on the right side and at the base, and is thickened within. The parietal lamella is moderate in size, oblique, and recedes in a spiral manner. The columella is strongly twisted, truncated and notched at the base, and above is furnished with a low lamella.

== Distribution ==
This species occurs off the Philippines.
