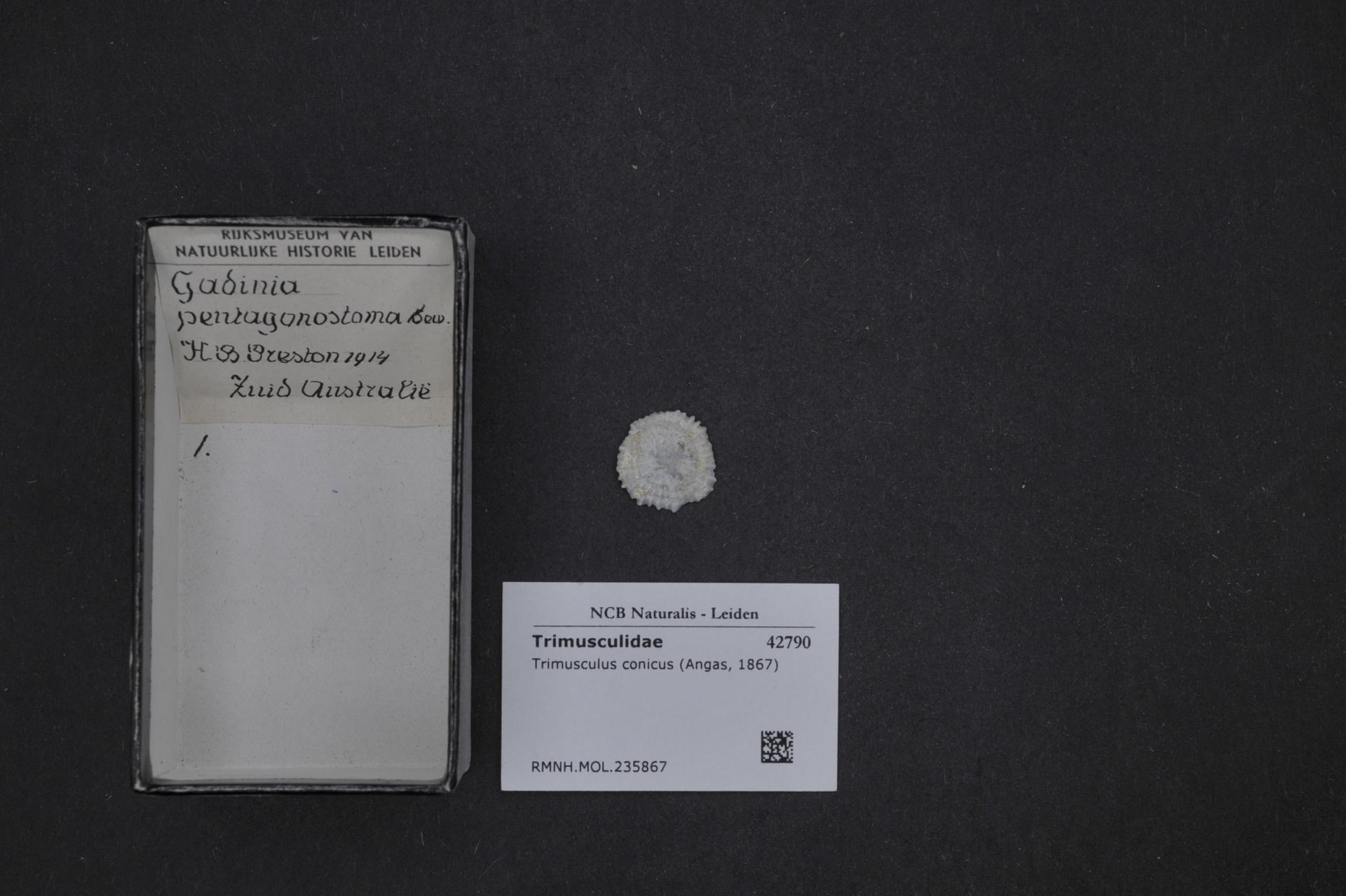

Scientific classification
- Kingdom: Animalia
- Phylum: Mollusca
- Class: Gastropoda
- Order: Ellobiida
- Family: Trimusculidae
- Genus: Trimusculus
- Species: T. conicus

Binomial name
- Trimusculus conicus (Angas, 1867)

Synonyms
- Gadinia conica Angas, 1867; Gadinalea conica Amalthea hexagona Suter, 1906; Hipponix hexagonus (Suter, 1913); Hipponix hexagonus Powell, 1924

= Trimusculus conicus =

Species of gastropod

Trimusculus conicus is an air-breathing sea snail or false limpet, a pulmonate gastropod mollusc in the family Trimusculidae, the button snails.

This species is endemic to eastern and southern Australia, and New Zealand including the Chatham Islands.

== Shell description ==
The shell is ovate, conoidal, generally depressed, radiately ribbed, apex rather posterior. The sculpture consists of about 40 subequal narrowly rounded straight riblets, some of which do not extend to the summit. Concentric growth lines are mostly present, and very often produce prominent ridges. The shell colour is white, light-pinkish towards the margin; the interior is white, the margin light pink. The apex is subcentral to nearly marginal, small and distinctly uncinate in well-preserved specimens; anterior and side slopes convex, posterior slope straight, concave, or lightly convex. The interior is shiny with the adductor-scar and siphonal groove distinctly showing. The margin is very slightly crenulate.

- Low form: Length is up to 26 mm, width 22.5 mm, and height 8 mm.
- High form: Length is up to 22 mm, width 18.5 mm, and height 15 mm.
