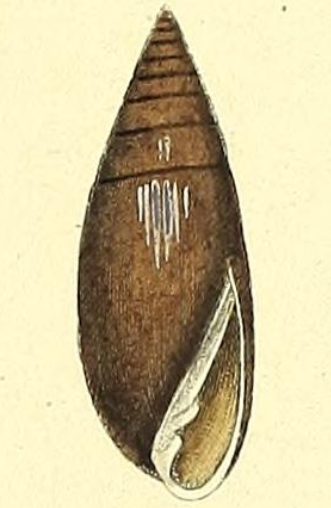
- Original picture of Auriculastra elongata

Scientific classification
- Kingdom: Animalia
- Phylum: Mollusca
- Class: Gastropoda
- Order: Ellobiida
- Family: Ellobiidae
- Genus: Auriculastra
- Species: A. elongata

Binomial name
- Auriculastra elongata (Küster, 1845)

Synonyms
- Auricula elongata Küster, 1845 superseded combination; Auriculus elongatus (Küster, 1845) superseded combination

= Auriculastra elongata =

Species of gastropod

Auriculastra elongata is a species of air-breathing land snail, a terrestrial gastropod mollusc in the family Ellobiidae, the salt marsh snails.

== Description ==
(Original description in Latin and German) The shell slightly fissured and is spindle- to cylindrical-shaped It is somewhat finely striated, rather glossy and dark tawny in color. The spire is sharp and often truncated. The aperture is oblong and narrow; the peristome is slightly reflected and somewhat thickened at the lip, and the columella bears two folds.

The shell of this species is very elongated, almost cylindrical and spindle-shaped, solid, and finely striated; toward the lip it shows strong growth lines. It has a dull sheen and is deep reddish-brown in color. The spire is high and conical, composed of six to seven very low and flat whorls; the body whorl is fairly high and only slightly convex. Often the whorls are truncated down to two remaining.

The body whorl is very flatly convex and tapers almost evenly on both sides; the base is compressed and has an almost imperceptible umbilical slit. The aperture is elongated and very narrow, constricted at the top. The lip is bluntly sharpened, scarcely curved outward, and somewhat thickened within; it is pale horn-colored. The columella bears a reflection that is scarcely noticeable above but forms a callous lip below, and it has two folds, of which the lower one lies far within and is rather small.

== Distribution ==
This species occurs in the Philippines, Japan, Indonesia, Fiji, Hawaii; Vanuatu and the Solomon Islands.
