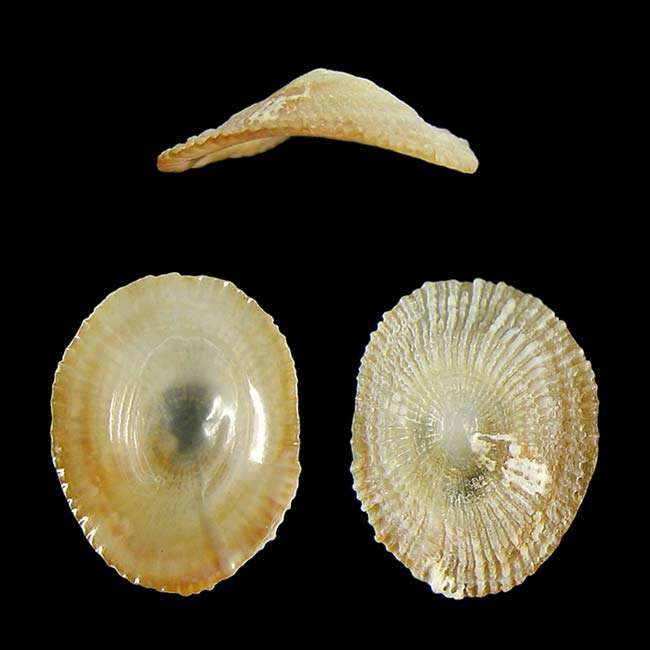

Scientific classification
- Kingdom: Animalia
- Phylum: Mollusca
- Class: Gastropoda
- Order: Ellobiida
- Family: Trimusculidae
- Genus: Trimusculus
- Species: T. escondidus

Binomial name
- Trimusculus escondidus Poppe & Groh, 2009

= Trimusculus escondidus =

Species of gastropod

Trimusculus escondidus is a species of sea snail, a marine gastropod mollusk in the family Trimusculidae.

== Original description ==
- Poppe G. & Groh K. (2009) A new species of Trimusculus (Gastropoda: Eupulmonata: Trimusculidae) from the Central Philippines. Visaya 2(5): 91-93. [September 2009].
