= Auriculastra brachyspira =

Scientific classification
- Kingdom: Animalia
- Phylum: Mollusca
- Class: Gastropoda
- Order: Ellobiida
- Family: Ellobiidae
- Genus: Auriculastra
- Species: A. brachyspira

Binomial name
- Auriculastra brachyspira (Möllendorff, 1894)

Synonyms
- Melampus brachyspirus Möllendorff, 1894 (original combination)

Species of gastropod

Auriculastra brachyspira is a species of air-breathing land snail, a terrestrial gastropod mollusc in the family Ellobiidae, the salt marsh snails.

== Description ==
The length of the shell attains 7.5 mm, its diameter 4 mm.

(Original description in Latin) The shell is imperforate and somewhat cylindrical in shape, rather solid, and finely marked with small folded striations, yet almost smooth overall, and shining. It is of a pale olive color. The spire is very short, with the apex being somewhat mucronate (slightly pointed) and translucent.

It has five whorls, which are flat; the body whorl is slightly compressed laterally and is a little swollen at the base. The aperture is very narrow and oblong. The peristome is straight and sharp, and is white-calloused within. There is a single parietal lamella, which is strong and horizontal. The columella is somewhat thickened and bears two folds.

== Distribution ==
This species occurs in brackish waters on Cebu Island, the Philippines.
