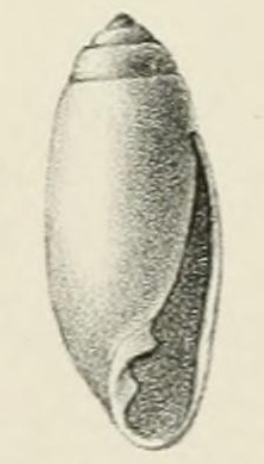
- Original drawing of a shell of Auriculastra catonis

Scientific classification
- Kingdom: Animalia
- Phylum: Mollusca
- Class: Gastropoda
- Order: Ellobiida
- Family: Ellobiidae
- Genus: Auriculastra
- Species: A. catonis

Binomial name
- Auriculastra catonis (Melvill & Ponsonby, 1899)

Synonyms
- Auricula catonis Melvill & Ponsonby, 1899 superseded combination

= Auriculastra catonis =

Species of gastropod

Auriculastra catonis is a species of air-breathing land snail, a terrestrial gastropod mollusc in the family Ellobiidae, the salt marsh snails.

== Description ==
The length of the shell attains 9 mm, its diameter 4 mm.

(Original description in Latin) The shell is oblong-cylindrical and slender, with a glossy and very smooth surface, and it is pale olive in color. In our decollated specimens, it probably has five whorls; the last three are irregularly impressed at the sutures, and the body whorl is elongated, straight, and cylindrical in form.

The aperture is narrowly oblong and white. The outer lip is straight and simple. The columella is slightly thickened, not glossy, and it bears two folds.

== Distribution ==
This terrestrial species occurs near Durban Bay, South Africa.
