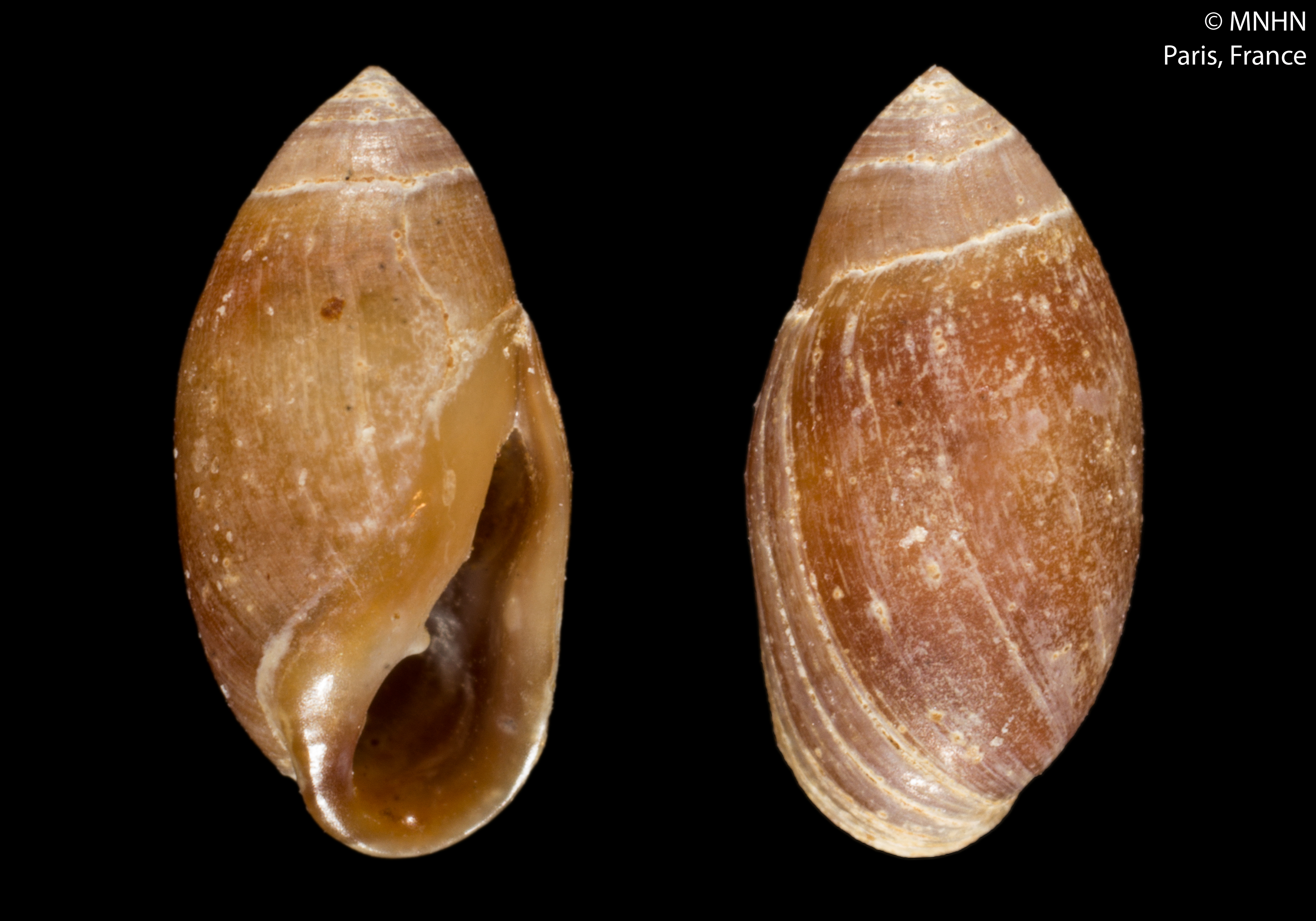
- Shell of Auriculastra duplicata (syntype in the MNHN, Paris)

Scientific classification
- Kingdom: Animalia
- Phylum: Mollusca
- Class: Gastropoda
- Order: Ellobiida
- Superfamily: Ellobioidea
- Family: Ellobiidae
- Genus: Auriculastra; Martens, 1880

Type species
- Auriculastra subula Quoy & Gaimard, 1832

Synonyms
- Auriculastra (Conauricula) Kókay, 2006 †· accepted, alternate representation; Cylindrotis Möllendorff, 1895; Marinula (Auriculastra) Martens, 1880 (original rank)

= Auriculastra =

Genus of gastropods

Auriculastra is a genus of air-breathing land snails, terrestrial gastropod mollusks in the subfamily Pythiinae of the family Ellobiidae, the salt marsh snails.

== Description ==
(Described in Latin as Cylindrotis) The shell is almost cylindrical in shape. The aperture is narrow. The peristome is straight and blunt, and it is thickened within by a lip. There is a single parietal lamella. The columella is strongly twisted and truncated, and there are two palatal folds.

== Distribution ==
Species of this marine genus occur in the Indo-Pacific Ocean from Mauritius and the Comores to Southeast Asia and Indonesia, New Guinea, the Philippines and also New Caledonia and Australia (Queensland).

== Species ==
Species in the genus Auriculastra include:

- Auriculastra acuta Connolly, 1922
- † Auriculastra aquensis (Tournouër, 1872)
- † Auriculastra badeniensis Kókay, 2006
- † Auriculastra biplicata (Grateloup, 1828)
- Auriculastra brachyspira (Möllendorff, 1894)
- Auriculastra catonis (Melvill & Ponsonby, 1899)
- † Auriculastra dumasi (Cossmann, 1895)
- Auriculastra duplicata (L. Pfeiffer, 1854)
- Auriculastra elongata (Küster, 1845)
- Auriculastra gassiesi (Morelet, 1882)
- Auriculastra hyalina (Morelet, 1883)
- Auriculastra oparica (H. Adams & A. Adams, 1854)
- † Auriculastra ovata (Briart & Cornet, 1887)
- Auriculastra pusilla (H. Adams & A. Adams, 1854)
- Auriculastra quadrasi (Möllendorff, 1895)
- Auriculastra radiolata (Morelet, 1860)
- Auriculastra saccata (L. Pfeiffer, 1856)
- Auriculastra semiplicata (H. Adams & A. Adams, 1854)
- Auriculastra siamensis (Brandt, 1974)
- Auriculastra subula (Quoy & Gaimard, 1832)

Species brought into synonymy

- Auriculastra amplicata (Jickeli, 1874): synonym of Laemodonta amplicata] Jickeli, 1874 synonym of Pedipes amplicatus (Jickeli, 1874)
- Auriculastra bronnii (R. A. Philippi, 1846): synonym of Allochroa bronnii (R. A. Philippi, 1846) (superseded combination)
- Auriculastra incrassata (H. Adams & A. Adams, 1854): synonym of Auriculastra elongata (Küster, 1845)
- Auriculastra nana Haas, 1950: synonym of Microtralia ovulum (Pfeiffer, 1840)
- Auriculastra nevillei (Morelet, 1882): synonym of Auriculastra radiolata (Morelet, 1860) (junior synonym)
- Auriculastra oblonga (Jickeli, 1874): synonym of Laemodonta oblonga Jickeli, 1874
- Auriculastra pellucens (Menke, 1828): synonym of Ellobium dominicense (A. Férussac, 1821) (junior subjective synonym)
