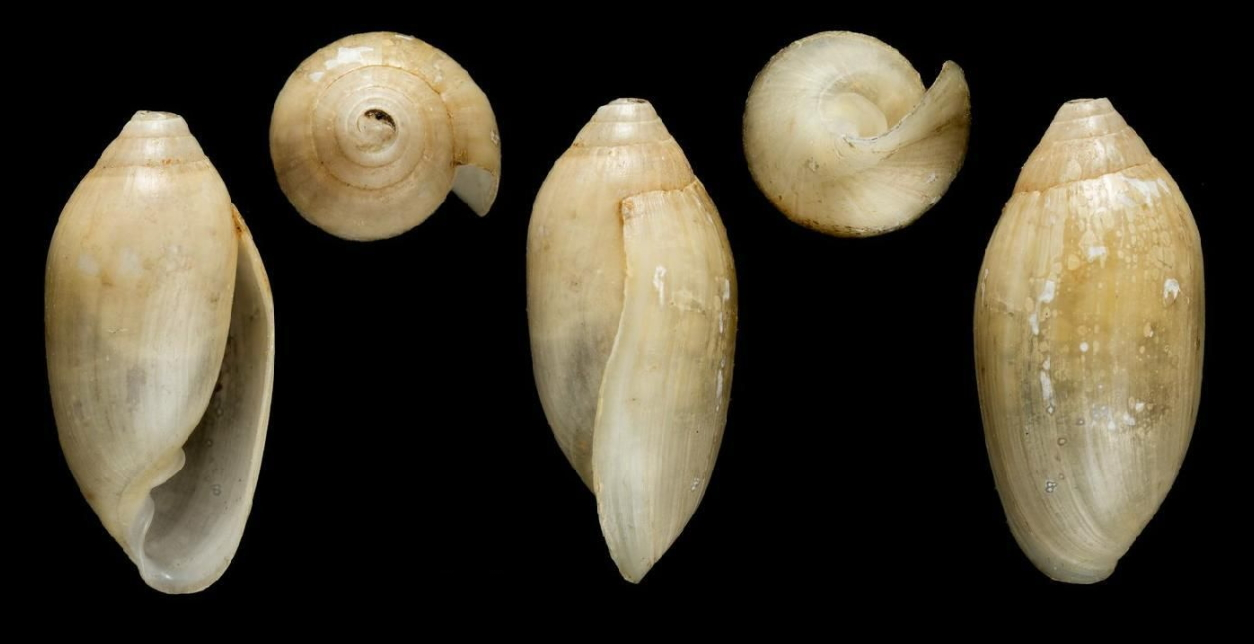
- Shell of Auriculastra radiolata (syntype at the Natural History Museum, London)

Scientific classification
- Kingdom: Animalia
- Phylum: Mollusca
- Class: Gastropoda
- Order: Ellobiida
- Family: Ellobiidae
- Genus: Auriculastra
- Species: A. radiolata

Binomial name
- Auriculastra radiolata (Morelet, 1860)

Synonyms
- Auricula durbanica Melvill & Ponsonby, 1899 junior subjective synonym; Auricula nevillei Morelet, 1882 (junior synonym); Auriculastra nevillei (Morelet, 1882) (junior synonym); Melampus radiolatus Morelet, 1860 superseded combination; Ringicula acutispira W. H. Turton, 1932 (junior synonym)onyms =

= Auriculastra radiolata =

Species of gastropod

Auriculastra radiolata is a species of air-breathing land snail, a terrestrial gastropod mollusc in the family Ellobiidae, the salt marsh snails.

== Description ==
The length of the shell attains 11.5 mm, its diameter 5.5 mm.

(Description as Auricula durbanica in Latin) The shell is oblong, smooth, and slightly glossy, and it is pale olive in color, with the apex decollated. It probably has five whorls, which are irregularly impressed at the sutures; they are smooth or only faintly marked with indistinct longitudinal striations, and the body whorl is broad.

The aperture is narrowly oblong. The peristome is thin and simple. The columella is scarcely glossy, whitish in color, and bears two oblique folds.

== Distribution ==
This species occurs in brackish waters on Zanzibar.
