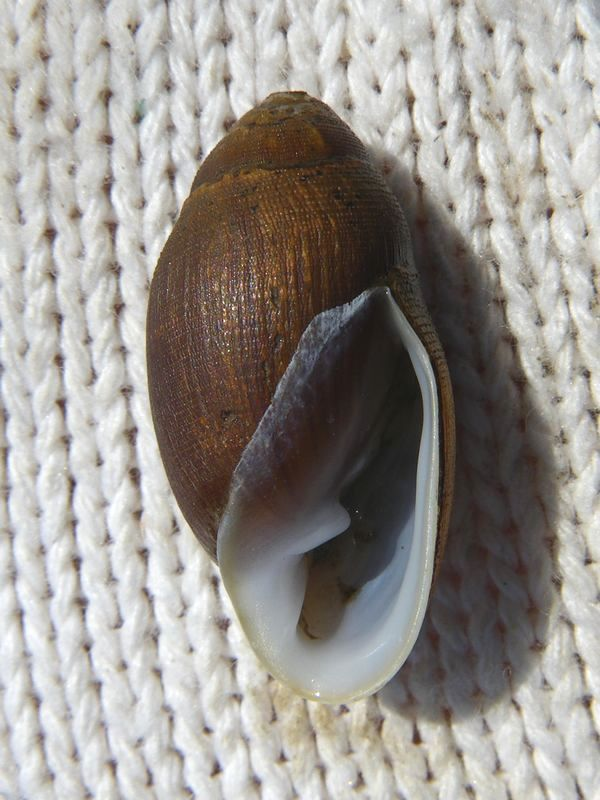
- Apertural view of shell of Ellobium chinense

Scientific classification
- Kingdom: Animalia
- Phylum: Mollusca
- Class: Gastropoda
- Order: Ellobiida
- Family: Ellobiidae
- Genus: Ellobium
- Species: E. chinense

Binomial name
- Ellobium chinense (Pfeiffer, 1864)

Synonyms
- Ellobium chinensis

= Ellobium chinense =

Species of gastropod

Ellobium chinense is a species of small, air-breathing, snail, a terrestrial pulmonate gastropod mollusk in the family Ellobiidae.

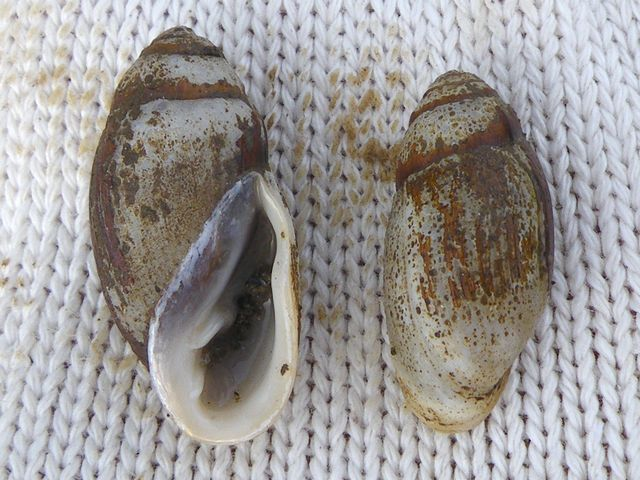
apertural and abapertural view of shell of Ellobium chinense

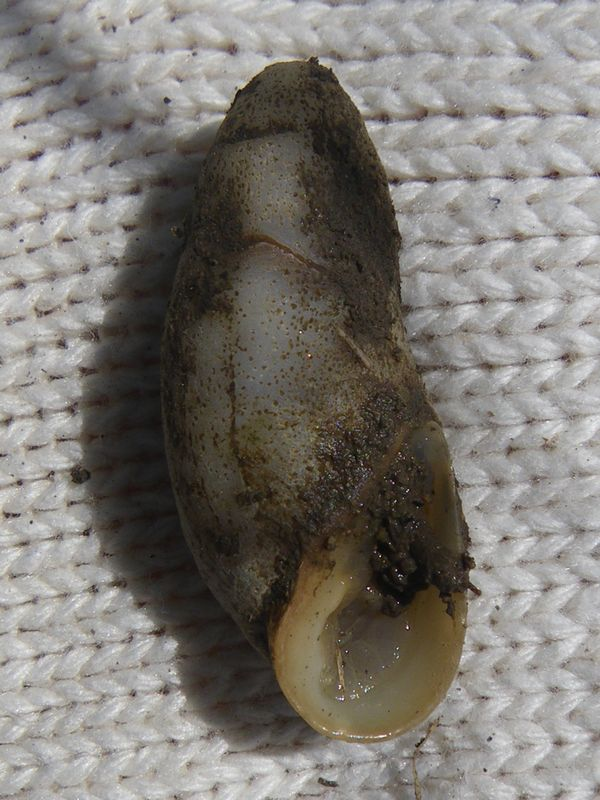
old shell of Ellobium chinense

== Distribution ==
This species occurs in Japan (Honshū, Kyūshū and Shikoku) and it is Vulnerable species in Japan.
