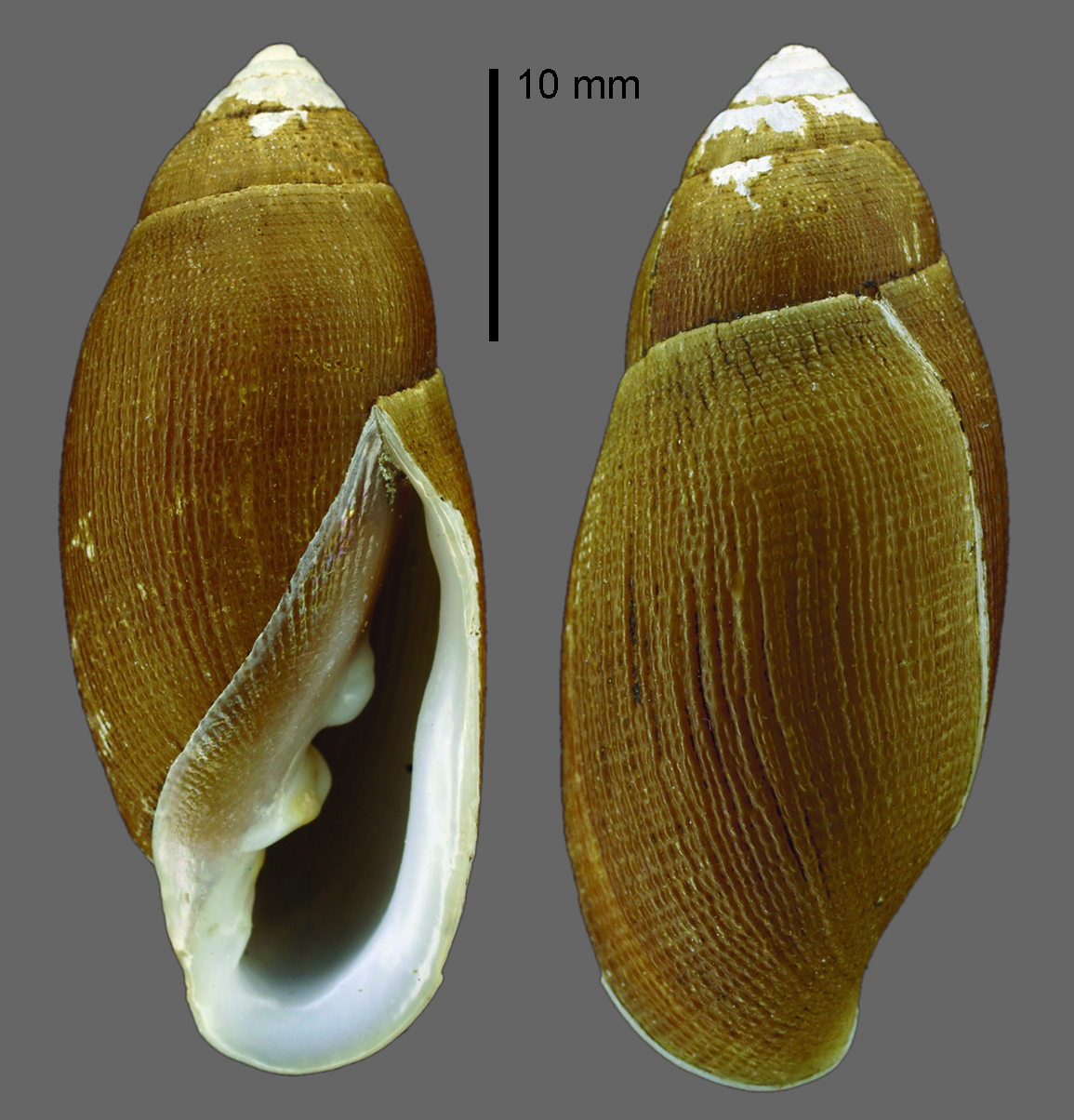

Scientific classification
- Kingdom: Animalia
- Phylum: Mollusca
- Class: Gastropoda
- Order: Ellobiida
- Family: Ellobiidae
- Genus: Ellobium
- Species: E. aurisjudae

Binomial name
- Ellobium aurisjudae (Linnaeus, 1758)

= Ellobium aurisjudae =

Species of gastropod

Ellobium aurisjudae is a species of gastropods belonging to the family Ellobiidae.

The species is found in Eastern Asia, Malesia. It specifically can be found in mangrove forests and feeds on the leaf litter of Bruguiera parviflora.
