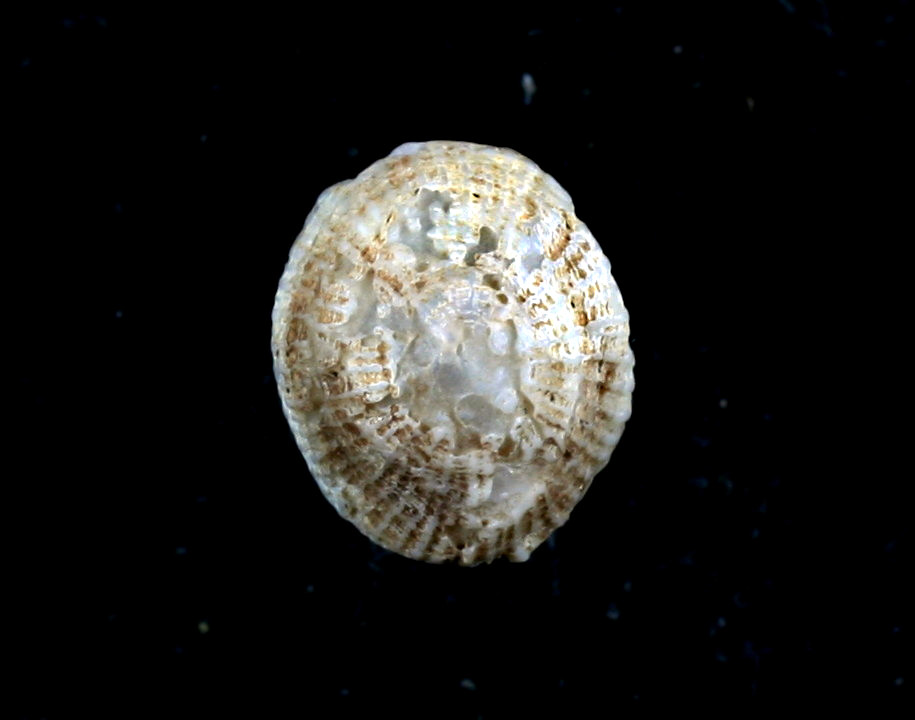
- Dorsal view of a shell of Trimusculus reticulatus (Sowerby, 1835)

Scientific classification
- Kingdom: Animalia
- Phylum: Mollusca
- Class: Gastropoda
- Order: Ellobiida
- Superfamily: Trimusculoidea; J. Q. Burch, 1945 (1840)
- Family: Trimusculidae; J. Q. Burch, 1945 (1840)
- Genus: Trimusculus; F. C. Schmidt, 1818

Species
- See text

Synonyms
- Synonym of Trimusculidae: Gadiniidae Gray, 1840; Synonyms of Trimusculus: Clypeus Scacchi, 1833 (junior homonym of Clypeus Leske, 1778 (Echinoidea) ); Gadinalea Iredale, 1940; Gadinia Gray, 1824; Gadinia (Rowellia) Carpenter, 1864; Mouretia G. B. Sowerby I, 1835; Rowellia Carpenter, 1864

= Trimusculus =

Genus of gastropods

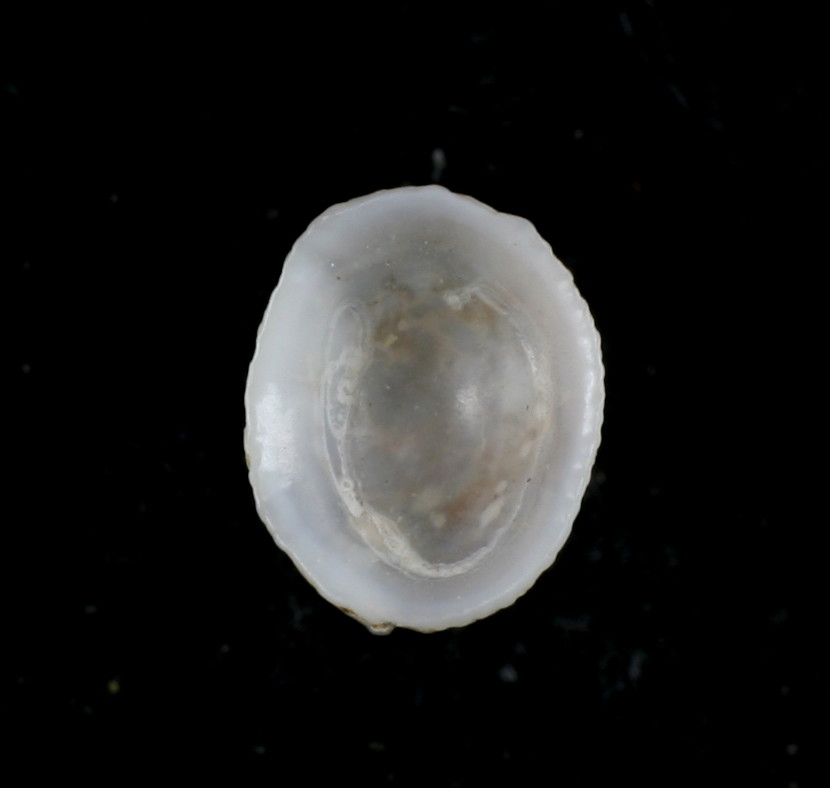
Apertural view of shell of Trimusculus reticulatus

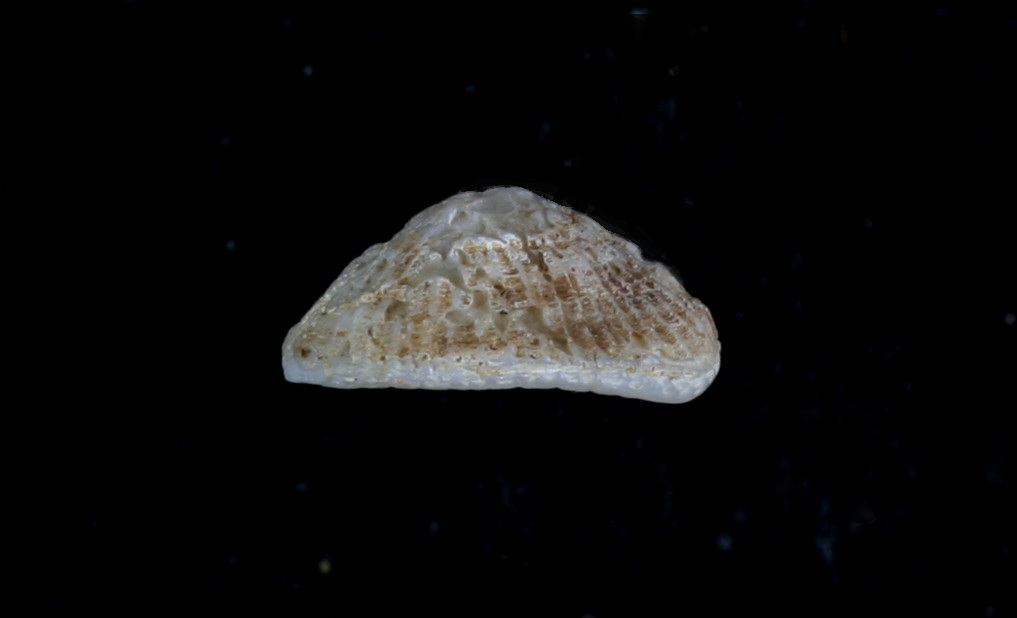
Profile view of shell of Trimusculus reticulatus

Trimusculus is a genus of medium-sized air-breathing sea snails or false limpets, marine pulmonate gastropod molluscs in the family Trimusculidae.

Trimusculus is the only genus in the family Trimusculidae. Trimusculidae, the button snails, is the only family in the superfamily Trimusculoidea, a superfamily of false limpets. These are marine pulmonate gastropod mollusks in the clade Eupulmonata.

Trimusculids are not very closely related to the siphonariids, another family of marine air-breathing false-limpets. The trimusculids are in the clade Eupulmonata, and are quite closely related to air-breathing land snails.

== Description ==
Trimusculids are sometimes known as "button shells" or "button snails" because, especially in the eastern Pacific species Trimusculus reticulatus, the shells are small, white, almost perfectly circular in outline, only moderately elevated, and thus the shells are somewhat reminiscent of traditional white shirt buttons.

== Species ==
Species within the genus Trimusculus include:

- Trimusculus afer (Gmelin, 1791)
- Trimusculus carinatus (Dall, 1870)
- Trimusculus conicus (Angas, 1867) - synonym: Gadinalea conica (Angas, 1867)
- Trimusculus costatus (Krauss, 1848)
- Trimusculus escondidus Poppe & Groh, 2009
- Trimusculus goesi (Hubendick, 1946)
- Trimusculus kurodai Habe, 1958
- Trimusculus mammillaris (Linnaeus, 1758)
- Trimusculus mauritianus (Martens, 1880)
- Trimusculus niveus (Hutton, 1883) - synonym: Gadinalea nivea Hutton, 1883
- Trimusculus odhneri (Hubendick, 1946)
- Trimusculus peruvianus (Sowerby II, 1835)
- Trimusculus reticulatus (Sowerby II, 1835)
- Trimusculus stellatus (Sowerby II, 1835)
- Trimusculus yamamotoi Habe, 1958

Synonyms

- Trimusculus mammilaris [sic]: synonym of Trimusculus mammillaris (Linnaeus, 1758) (misspelling of mammillaris (Linnaeus, 1758))
- Trimusculus niveus (Hutton, 1878): synonym of Trimusculus conicus (Angas, 1867)
- Trimusculus semicorneus (Preston, 1908): synonym of Acmaea semicornea Preston, 1908: synonym of Discradisca semicornea (Preston, 1908)
