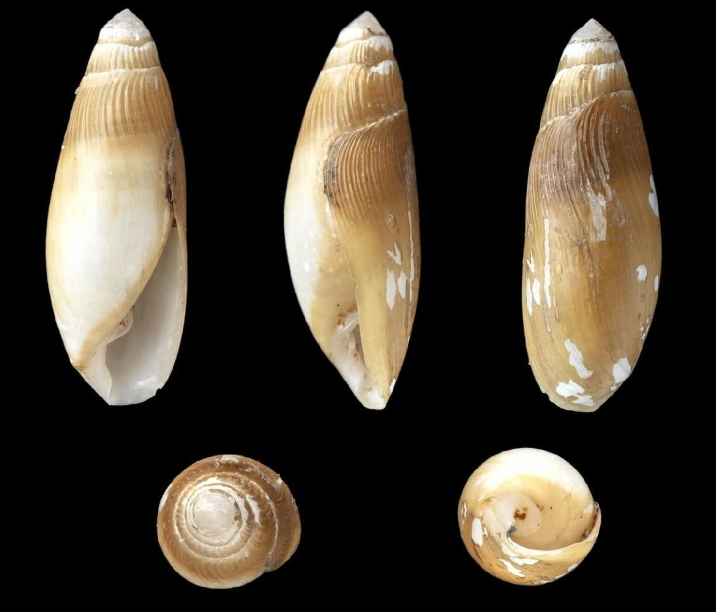
- Shell of Auriculastra semiplicata (specimen at the Natural History Museum, London)

Scientific classification
- Kingdom: Animalia
- Phylum: Mollusca
- Class: Gastropoda
- Order: Ellobiida
- Superfamily: Ellobioidea
- Family: Ellobiidae
- Genus: Auriculastra
- Species: A. semiplicata

Binomial name
- Auriculastra semiplicata (H. Adams & A. Adams, 1854)

Synonyms
- Cylindrotis quadrasi Möllendorff, 1895; Ellobium semiplicatum H. Adams & A. Adams, 1854 (original combination); Melampus pseudocommodus Schmeltz, 1869 nomen nudum; Melampus semplicatus H. Adams & A. Adams, 1854 superseded combination

= Auriculastra semiplicata =

Species of gastropod

Auriculastra semiplicata is a species of air-breathing land snail, a terrestrial gastropod mollusc in the family Ellobiidae, the salt marsh snails.

== Description ==
The length of the shell attains 3 mm, its diameter 1.5 mm.

(Original description in Latin) The shell is subulate-cylindrical with a blunt spire and an eroded apex; it is olive-colored, smooth, and shining. The whorls are flat and longitudinally ribbed; the body whorl is folded toward the back but becomes smooth toward the front. The aperture is narrow and contracted at the rear. The columella features three folds, with the posterior fold being strong and spiral. The outer lip is sharp and simple, and it is also contracted at the back.

== Distribution ==
This species occurs off the Philippines, Indonesia, Singapore and Japan.
