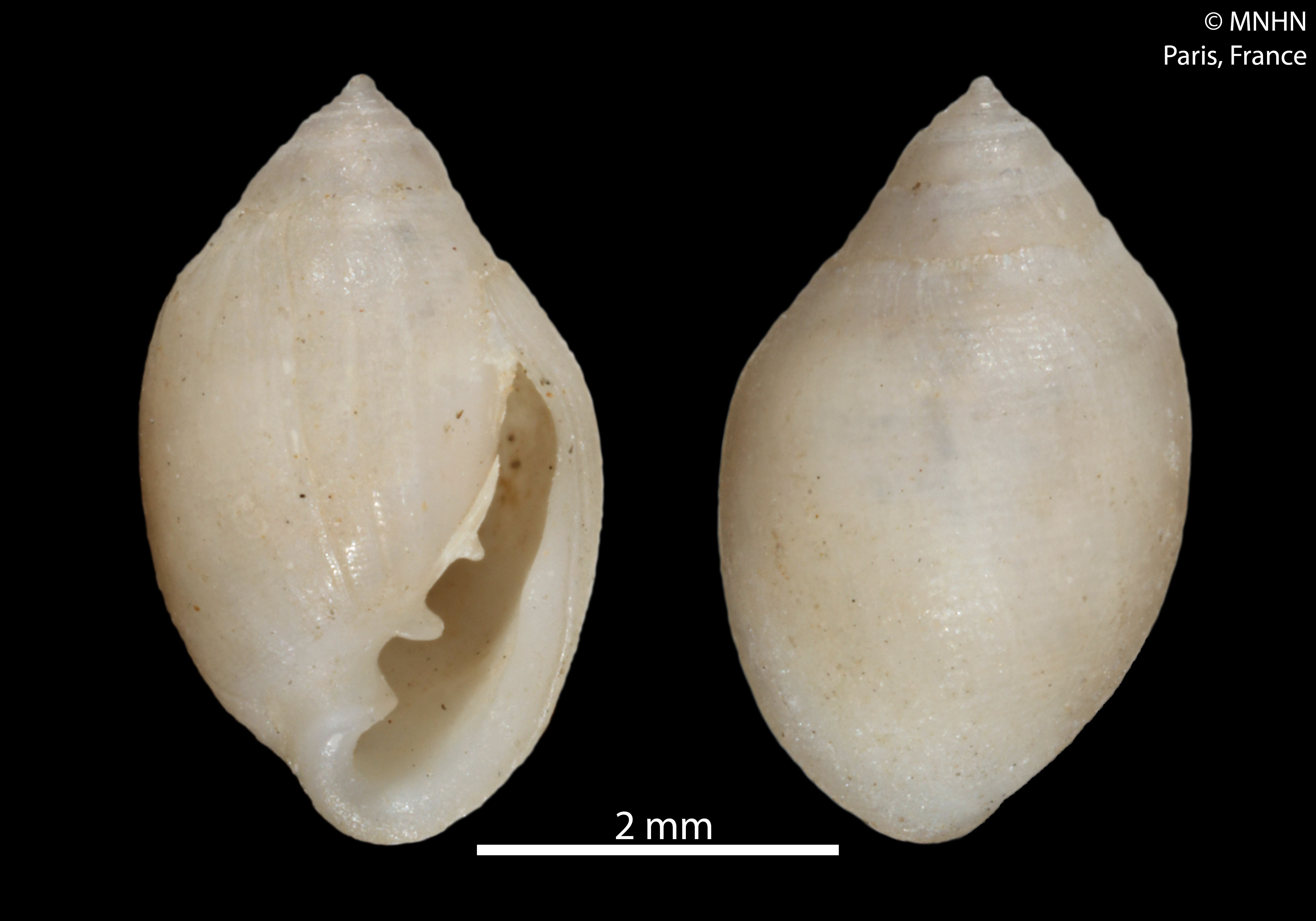
- Shell of Pseudomelampus exiguus (paratype at MNHN, Paris)

Scientific classification
- Kingdom: Animalia
- Phylum: Mollusca
- Class: Gastropoda
- Order: Ellobiida
- Family: Ellobiidae
- Subfamily: Pedipedinae
- Genus: Pseudomelampus; Pallary, 1900
- Species: P. exiguus

Binomial name
- Pseudomelampus exiguus (Lowe, 1832)

Synonyms
- Alexia (Pseudomelampus) Pallary, 1900

= Pseudomelampus =

Genus of gastropods

Pseudomelampus is a monotypic genus of gastropods in the subfamily Pedipedinae belonging to the family Ellobiidae.

The only species is Pseudomelampus exiguus.

The species is found in Atlantic Ocean off the Canary Islands.
