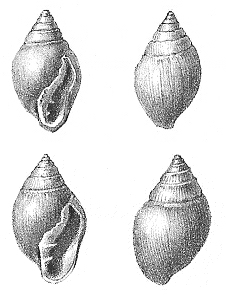
- Shells of Ellobium pyramidale

Scientific classification
- Domain: Eukaryota
- Kingdom: Animalia
- Phylum: Mollusca
- Class: Gastropoda
- Order: Ellobiida
- Family: Ellobiidae
- Genus: Ellobium
- Species: E. pyramidale

Binomial name
- Ellobium pyramidale Sowerby, 1822

= Ellobium pyramidale =

Species of gastropod

Ellobium pyramidale is a species of small, air-breathing, saltmarsh snail, a terrestrial pulmonate gastropod mollusk in the family Ellobiidae.

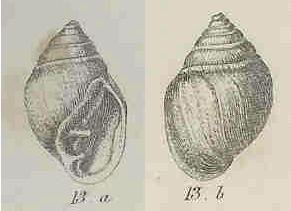
Shells of Ellobium pyramidale
