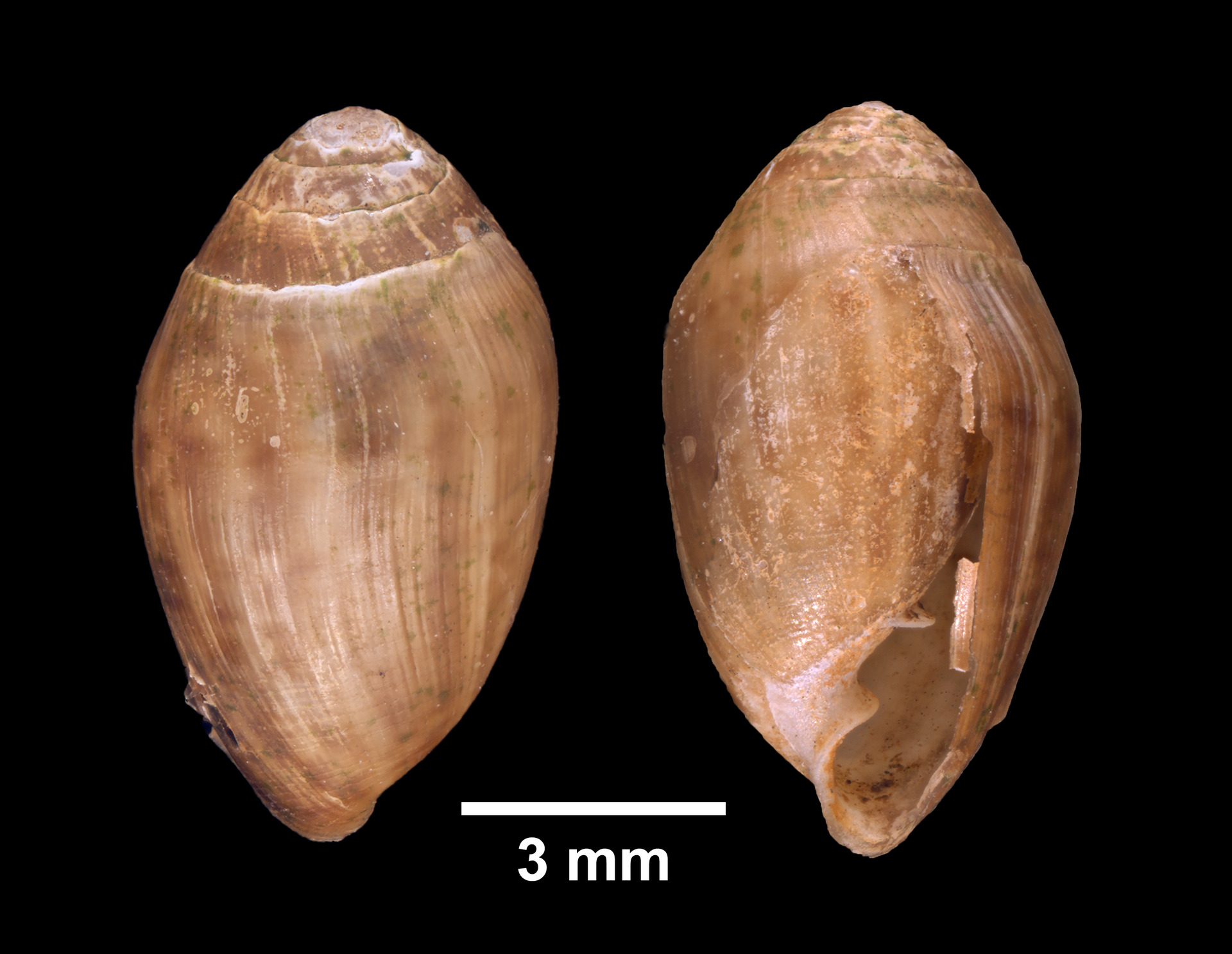

Conservation status
- Secure (NatureServe)

Scientific classification
- Kingdom: Animalia
- Phylum: Mollusca
- Class: Gastropoda
- Order: Ellobiida
- Family: Ellobiidae
- Genus: Melampus
- Species: M. bidentatus

Binomial name
- Melampus bidentatus Say, 1822

Synonyms
- Auricula cornea Deshayes, 1830; Melampus (Melampus) bidentatus Say, 1822; Melampus bidentatus var. lineatus Say, 1822; Melampus coffeus var. alternatus Davis, 1904; Melampus coffeus var. bishopii Davis, 1904; Melampus coffeus var. gundlachi Pfeiffer, 1853; Melampus coffeus var. redfieldi Pfeiffer, 1854; Melampus coffeus var. verticalis Davis, 1904; Melampus gundlachi Pfeiffer, 1853; Melampus lineatus Say, 1822; Melampus obliquus Say, 1822; Melampus redfieldi Pfeiffer, 1854

= Melampus bidentatus =

Species of mollusc

Melampus bidentatus common name the "common marsh snail", "eastern melampus", or "coffee bean snail" is a species of small, amphibious air-breathing snail, a pulmonate gastropod mollusk in the family Ellobiidae.

== Description ==
The maximum recorded shell length is 20 mm.

== Habitat and distribution ==
The minimum recorded depth for this species is 0 m; maximum recorded depth is 0 m. Like many others in the same family, this species of snail inhabits the high marsh zone of salt marshes, but it is also very common in the mud near oyster reefs. The native range of the snail is from the coast of Nova Scotia, Canada, to the Texas coast of the Gulf of Mexico. However, it is likely that this distribution involves at least three cryptic species with distinct physiological optima.

Adults of Melampus bidentatus can survive in a terrestrial environment, but its larvae require an aquatic habitat in order to survive.

The diet of this species consists of the decayed shoots of smooth cordgrass, Spartina alterniflora.
