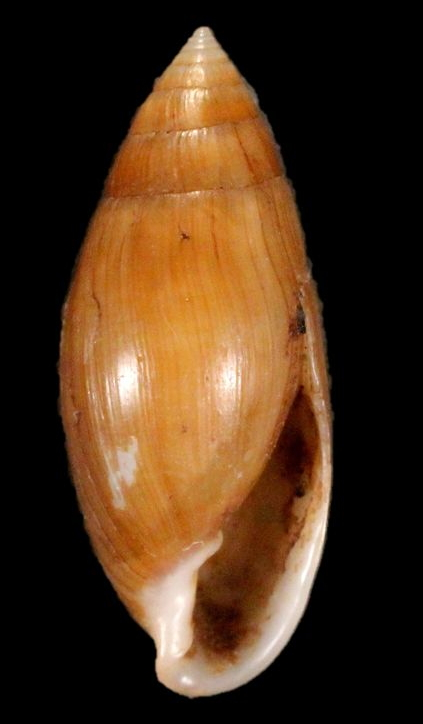
- Shell of Auriculastra oparica (specimen at Naturalis Biodiversity Center)

Scientific classification
- Kingdom: Animalia
- Phylum: Mollusca
- Class: Gastropoda
- Order: Ellobiida
- Superfamily: Ellobioidea
- Family: Ellobiidae
- Genus: Auriculastra
- Species: A. oparica

Binomial name
- Auriculastra oparica (H. Adams & A. Adams, 1854)

Synonyms
- Ellobium oparicum H. Adams & A. Adams, 1854 (original combination)

= Auriculastra oparica =

Species of gastropod

Auriculastra oparica is a species of air-breathing land snail, a terrestrial gastropod mollusc in the family Ellobiidae, the salt marsh snails.

== Description ==
The length of the shell attains 3 mm, its diameter 1.5 mm.

(Original description in Latin) The shell is subulate-oval (slender and tapering like an awl, yet somewhat oval), slender, smooth, and tawny in color. The spire is elevated with a sharp apex. The aperture is narrow, and the columella is scarcely truncated at the front. There are three folds on the columella: the posterior fold is strong, while the two anterior folds are somewhat obsolete and oblique. The outer lip is sharp and simple.

== Distribution ==
This species occurs off French Polynesia, Indonesia and the Philippines.
