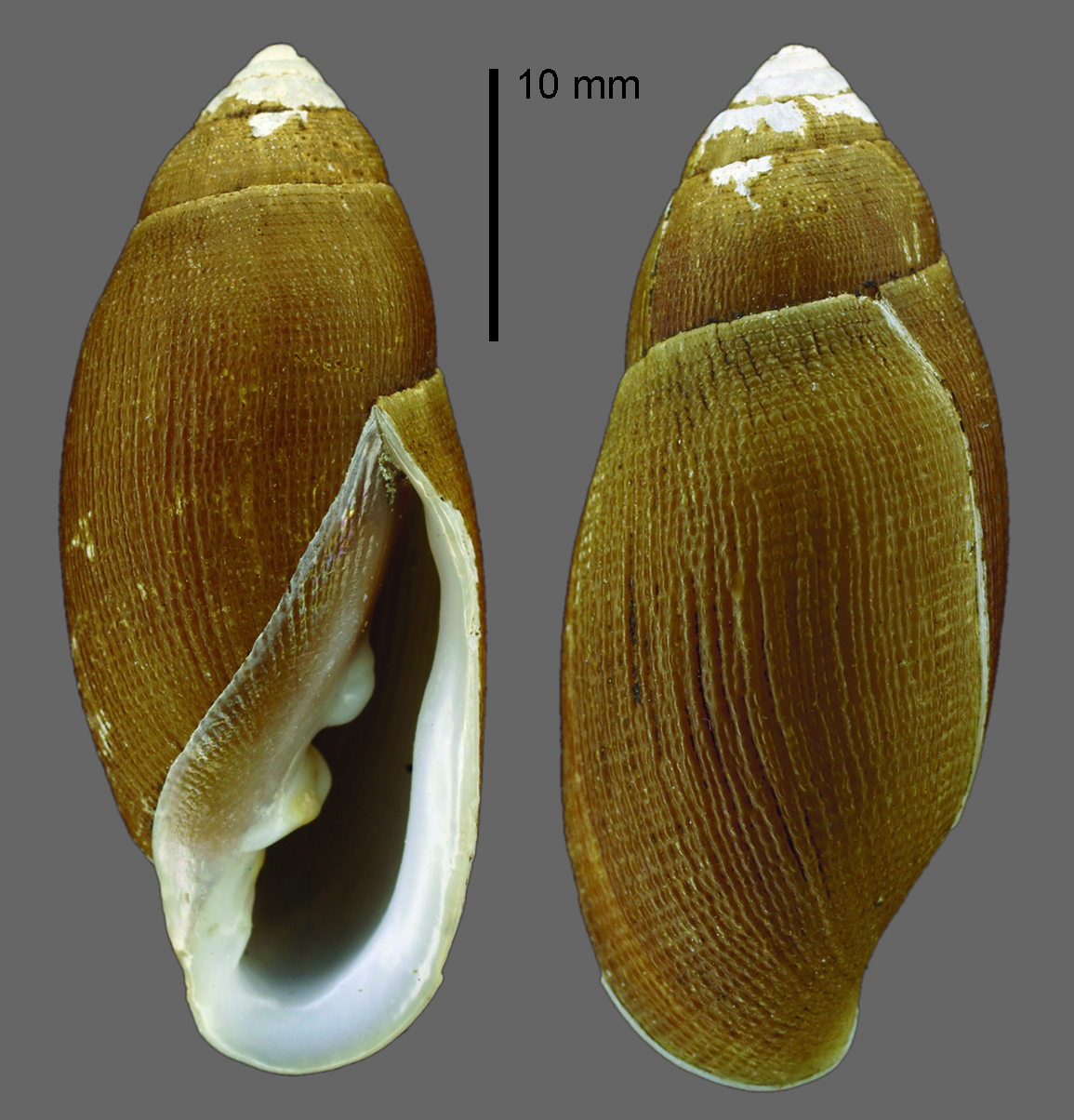
- Ellobium aurisjudae

Scientific classification
- Kingdom: Animalia
- Phylum: Mollusca
- Class: Gastropoda
- Superorder: Eupulmonata
- Order: Ellobiida; Van Mol, 1967

= Ellobiida =

Order of molluscs

Ellobiida is an order of gastropods belonging to the class Gastropoda.

Families:

- Ellobiidae
- Otinidae
- Trimusculidae
