= Amphidromus xiaoxiaoi =

Scientific classification
- Kingdom: Animalia
- Phylum: Mollusca
- Class: Gastropoda
- Order: Stylommatophora
- Family: Camaenidae
- Genus: Amphidromus
- Species: A. xiaoxiaoi

Binomial name
- Amphidromus xiaoxiaoi Y.-C. Wang & J. Parsons, 2022

Species of snail in the family Camaenidae

Amphidromus xiaoxiaoi is a species of medium-sized air-breathing tree snail, an arboreal gastropod mollusk in the family Camaenidae.

== Habitat ==
This species lives in trees.

== Distribution ==
The type locality of this species is Vietnam.
