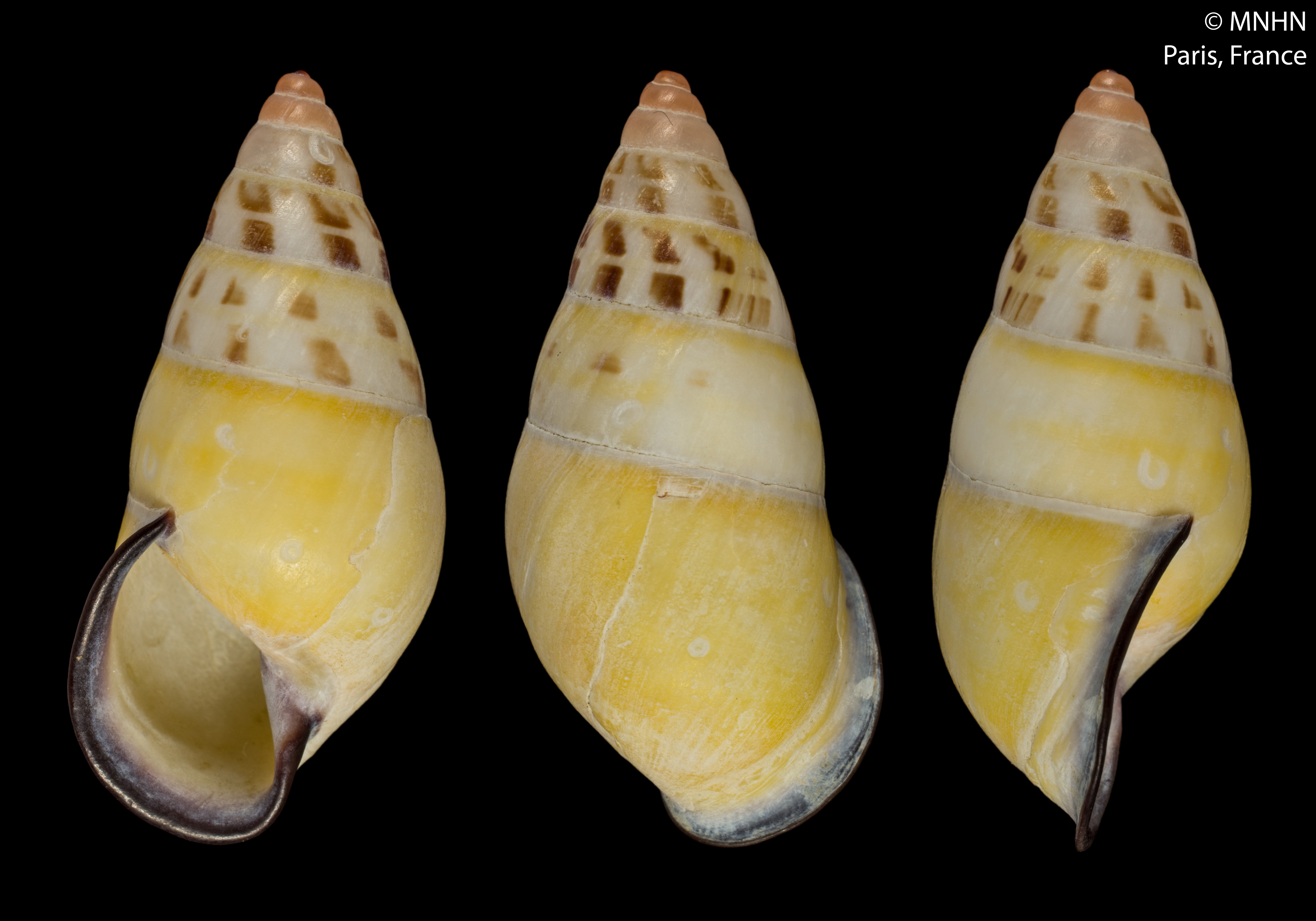
- Shell of Amphidromus trianensis (holotype at MNHN, Paris)

Scientific classification
- Kingdom: Animalia
- Phylum: Mollusca
- Class: Gastropoda
- Order: Stylommatophora
- Family: Camaenidae
- Genus: Amphidromus
- Species: A. trianensis

Binomial name
- Amphidromus trianensis Thach & F. Huber, 2018

= Amphidromus trianensis =

Species of snail in the family Camaenidae

Amphidromus trianensis is a species of medium-sized air-breathing tree snail, an arboreal gastropod mollusk in the family Camaenidae.

== Description ==
The length of the shell attains 31.8 mm.

== Habitat ==
This species lives in trees.

== Distribution ==
The type locality of this species is Vietnam.
