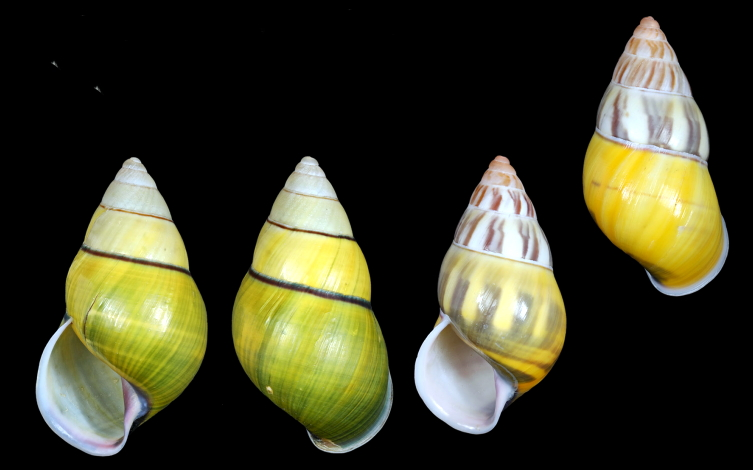
- Shell of Amphidromus qiongensis

Scientific classification
- Kingdom: Animalia
- Phylum: Mollusca
- Class: Gastropoda
- Order: Stylommatophora
- Family: Camaenidae
- Genus: Amphidromus
- Species: A. qiongensis

Binomial name
- Amphidromus qiongensis J. He & Q.-H. Zhou, 2017

Synonyms
- Amphidromus wani J. He & Q.-H. Zhou, 2017 (junior synonym)

= Amphidromus qiongensis =

Species of tree snail

Amphidromus qiongensis is a species of air-breathing tree snail, an arboreal gastropod mollusk in the family Camaenidae.

== Distribution ==
This species is endemic to Hainan, China.
