= Amphidromus felixi =

Scientific classification
- Kingdom: Animalia
- Phylum: Mollusca
- Class: Gastropoda
- Order: Stylommatophora
- Family: Camaenidae
- Genus: Amphidromus
- Species: A. felixi

Binomial name
- Amphidromus felixi Dharma, 2021

Species of tree snail

Amphidromus felixi is a species of air-breathing tree snail, an arboreal gastropod mollusk in the family Camaenidae.

== Distribution ==
This species is endemic to Sumatra, Indonesia.
