= Amphidromus taluensis =

Scientific classification
- Kingdom: Animalia
- Phylum: Mollusca
- Class: Gastropoda
- Order: Stylommatophora
- Family: Camaenidae
- Genus: Amphidromus
- Species: A. taluensis

Binomial name
- Amphidromus taluensis Gra-tes, 2015

Species of tree snail

Amphidromus taluensis is an extinct species of air-breathing tree snail, an arboreal gastropod mollusk in the family Camaenidae.

Subspecies

- Amphidromus taluensis borealis Gra-tes, 2015
- Amphidromus taluensis taluensis Gra-tes, 2015

== Distribution ==
This species is endemic to Thailand.
