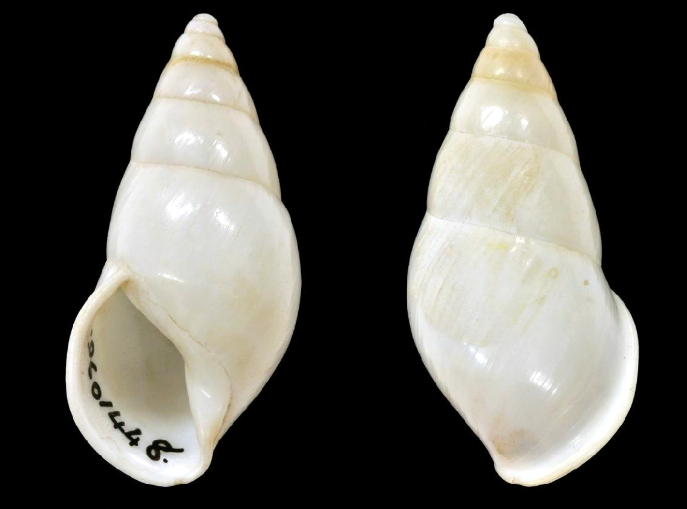
- Shell of Amphidromus lindstedti (lectotype at the NHMUK, London)

Scientific classification
- Kingdom: Animalia
- Phylum: Mollusca
- Class: Gastropoda
- Order: Stylommatophora
- Family: Camaenidae
- Genus: Amphidromus
- Species: A. lindstedti

Binomial name
- Amphidromus lindstedti (L. Pfeiffer, 1857)

Synonyms
- Amphidromus lindsteddti (L. Pfeiffer, 1857) (misspelling); Bulimus lindstedti L. Pfeiffer, 1857 (original combination)

= Amphidromus lindstedti =

Species of tree snail

Amphidromus lindstedti is a species of air-breathing tree snail, an arboreal gastropod mollusk in the family Camaenidae.

== Description ==
The length of this shell attains 39mm, its diameter 17 mm.

(Original description in Latin) The shell is sinistral, imperforate, and ovate-conical. It exhibits a solid structure, a finely striated surface, and a glossy, pure white coloration. The spire presents an elongate-conical form with a somewhat blunt apex. The shell contains six and a half somewhat convex whorls. The body whorl measures almost four-sevenths of the shell's length, displaying an obsolete angle and a rounded anterior. The columella appears somewhat vertical and scarcely twisted. The aperture lies almost diagonally and has a somewhat semi-circular shape. The peristome is slightly thickened and expanded, with its margins joined by a callus of the same color.

== Distribution ==
This species is endemic to Malaysia
