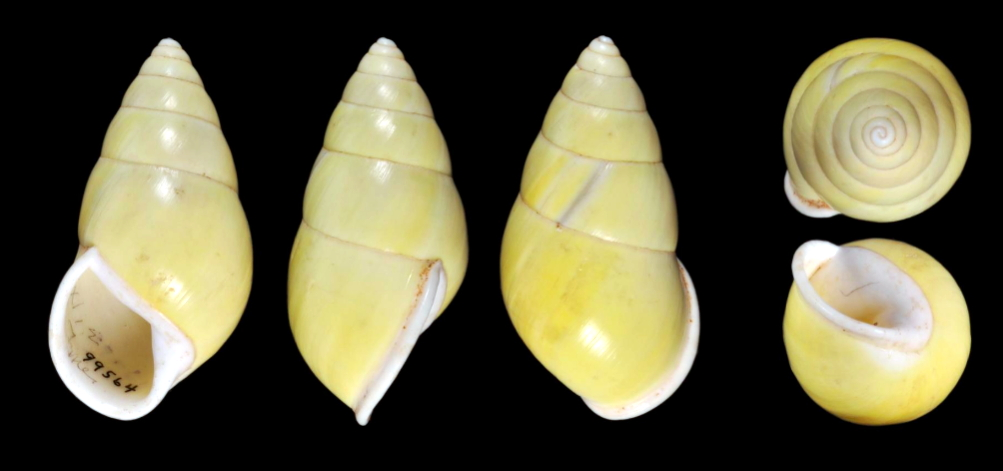
- Shells of Amphidromus suluensis (holotype)

Scientific classification
- Kingdom: Animalia
- Phylum: Mollusca
- Class: Gastropoda
- Order: Stylommatophora
- Family: Camaenidae
- Genus: Amphidromus
- Species: A. suluensis

Binomial name
- Amphidromus suluensis Bartsch, 1917

= Amphidromus suluensis =

Species of tree snail

Amphidromus suluensis is a species of air-breathing tree snail, an arboreal gastropod mollusk in the family Camaenidae.

== Description ==
The length of the shell attains 45.5 mm; its diameter 23.8 mm

(Original description) The elongate-ovate shell is dextral or sinistral. It is sulfur yellow, exhibiting occasional bluish-gray variceal streaks. The aperture and the peristome are white. The shell is appressed at the apex. The 6.5 whorls are moderately inflated, displaying fine growth lines and prominent varices. The sutures are moderately constricted. The aperture is small and broadly oval. The outer lip is reflected and thickened. The inner lip is slightly twisted and reflected over the umbilicus, which is typically obscured, and broadly expanded at its insertion, where it merges with the thick parietal callus.

== Distribution ==
This sinistral species is endemic to Sulu Archipelago, the Philippines.
