= Amphidromus bozhii =

Scientific classification
- Kingdom: Animalia
- Phylum: Mollusca
- Class: Gastropoda
- Order: Stylommatophora
- Family: Camaenidae
- Genus: Amphidromus
- Species: A. bozhii

Binomial name
- Amphidromus bozhii Y. C. Wang, 2019

Species of snail in the family Camaenidae

Amphidromus bozhii is a species of medium-sized air-breathing tree snail, an arboreal gastropod mollusk in the family Camaenidae.

== Description ==
The height of the shell of this chirally dimorphic (i.e. sinistral or dextral) species varies between 69.1 mm and 82.9 mm, its width between 38.3 mm and 42.0 mm.

== Habitat ==
This species lives in trees.

== Distribution ==
The type locality of this species is Vietnam.
