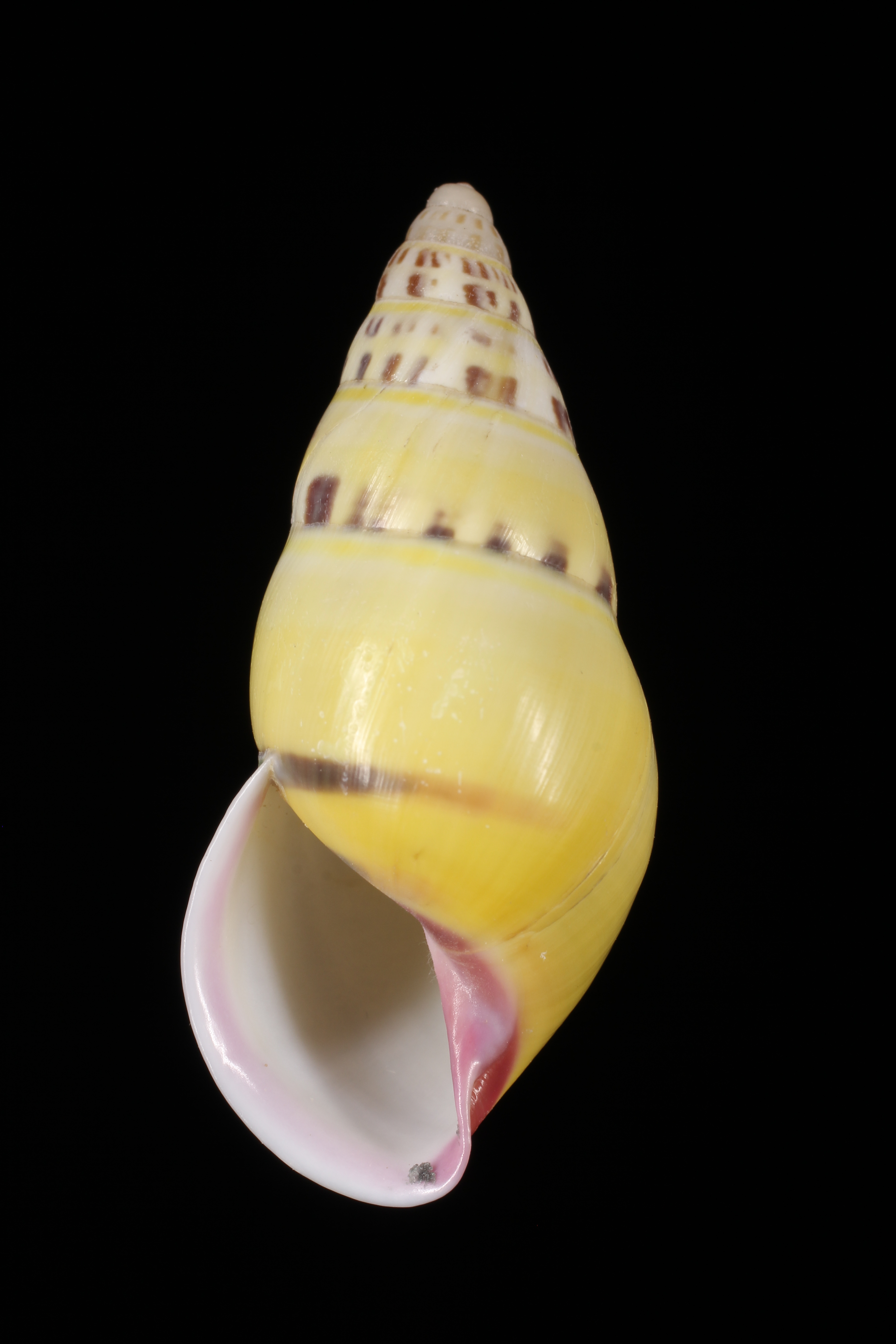
- Shell of Amphidromus poppei (holotype at the MNHN, Paris)

Scientific classification
- Kingdom: Animalia
- Phylum: Mollusca
- Class: Gastropoda
- Order: Stylommatophora
- Family: Camaenidae
- Genus: Amphidromus
- Species: A. poppei

Binomial name
- Amphidromus poppei Thach, 2020

= Amphidromus poppei =

Species of tree snail

Amphidromus poppei is a species of air-breathing tree snail, an arboreal gastropod mollusk in the family Camaenidae.

Subspecies

- Amphidromus poppei arnicoi Thach, 2020
- Amphidromus poppei poppei Thach, 2020

== Description ==
The length of this sinister shell attains 34.2 mm.

== Distribution ==
This species is endemic to Vietnam.
