= Amphidromus thalassochromus =

Scientific classification
- Kingdom: Animalia
- Phylum: Mollusca
- Class: Gastropoda
- Order: Stylommatophora
- Family: Camaenidae
- Genus: Amphidromus
- Species: A. thalassochromus

Binomial name
- Amphidromus thalassochromus Vermeulen & Junau, 2007

Species of snail

Amphidromus thalassochromus is a species of air-breathing land snail, a terrestrial pulmonate gastropod mollusc in the family Camaenidae.

The holotype is at Naturalis Biodiversity Center.

== Distribution ==
This species is endemic to Sarawak, Malaysia.
