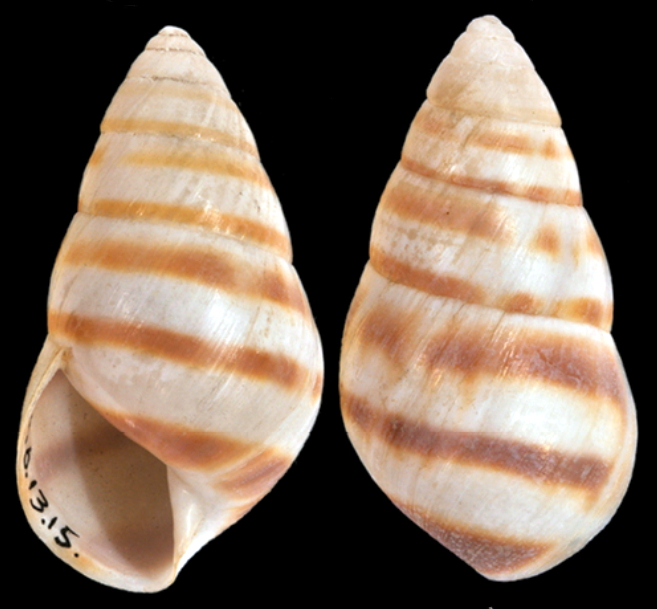
- Shell of Amphidromus robustus (syntype)

Scientific classification
- Kingdom: Animalia
- Phylum: Mollusca
- Class: Gastropoda
- Order: Stylommatophora
- Family: Camaenidae
- Genus: Amphidromus
- Species: A. robustus

Binomial name
- Amphidromus robustus Fulton, 1896

= Amphidromus robustus =

Species of tree snail

Amphidromus robustus is a species of air-breathing tree snail, an arboreal gastropod mollusk in the family Camaenidae.

== Description ==
The length of the shell attains 50 mm, its diameter 31 mm.

(Original description) The sinistral shell is ovate-conic, exhibiting a solid structure and an obliquely striate surface. It is almost imperforate and white, adorned with two brown spiral bands that commence at the third whorl, positioned above and below the suture, and continue to the body whorl. The body whorl also features one, and sometimes two, other bands on its lower half. Comprising seven convex whorls, the shell presents a white outer lip and columella, both expanded, with their margins joined by a white callus.

== Distribution ==
This species is endemic to Java, Indonesia.
