= Amphidromus mundus =

Scientific classification
- Kingdom: Animalia
- Phylum: Mollusca
- Class: Gastropoda
- Order: Stylommatophora
- Family: Camaenidae
- Genus: Amphidromus
- Species: A. mundus

Binomial name
- Amphidromus mundus (L. Pfeiffer, 1853)

Synonyms
- Amphidromus (Amphidromus) mundus (L. Pfeiffer, 1853) alternative representation; Bulimus mundus L. Pfeiffer, 1853 ·(original combination)

Species of tree snail

Amphidromus mundus is a species of air-breathing tree snail, an arboreal gastropod mollusk in the family Camaenidae.

== Description ==
The length of the shell attains 35 mm, its diameter 19 mm.

(Original description in Latin) The shell is imperforate and ventrose-ovate (swollen and egg-shaped), feeling somewhat solid and appearing almost smooth. It presents a uniformly white and glossy surface, lacking an epidermis. The spire exhibits a convex-conical shape with a somewhat papillate (nipple-like) apex. The suture is simple. The shell contains six somewhat convex whorl. The penultimate whorl appears somewhat angled, while the body whorl is scarcely shorter than the spire. The columella lies vertically and is somewhat compressed. The aperture is oblique and oval, appearing somewhat effuse (spread out) at the base. The peristome is slightly thickened and shortly expanded-reflected, with its margins joined by a thin callus, and the columellar margin is dilated and adnate (grown together).

== Distribution ==
This species is endemic to the Malaysia and Singapore.
