= Amphidromus asperoides =

Scientific classification
- Kingdom: Animalia
- Phylum: Mollusca
- Class: Gastropoda
- Order: Stylommatophora
- Family: Camaenidae
- Genus: Amphidromus
- Species: A. asperoides

Binomial name
- Amphidromus asperoides Jirapatrasilp & C.-T. Lee, 2024

Synonyms
- Amphidromus asper [non Haas]. Thach 2017

Species of tree snail

Amphidromus asperoides is a species of air-breathing tree snail, an arboreal gastropod mollusk in the family Camaenidae.

== Description ==
The length of the holotype attains 61.7 mm, its diameter is 34.9 mm. The shells have a pinkish white coloring with dark blotches.

== Distribution ==
This dextral species is endemic to Vietnam.
