= Amphidromus huberi =

Scientific classification
- Kingdom: Animalia
- Phylum: Mollusca
- Class: Gastropoda
- Order: Stylommatophora
- Family: Camaenidae
- Genus: Amphidromus
- Species: A. huberi

Binomial name
- Amphidromus huberi Thach, 2014

Synonyms
- Amphidromus (Syndromus) huberi Thach, 2014 alternative representation

Species of tree snail

Amphidromus huberi is a species of air-breathing tree snail, an arboreal gastropod mollusk in the family Camaenidae.

== Distribution ==
This species is endemic to Vietnam.
