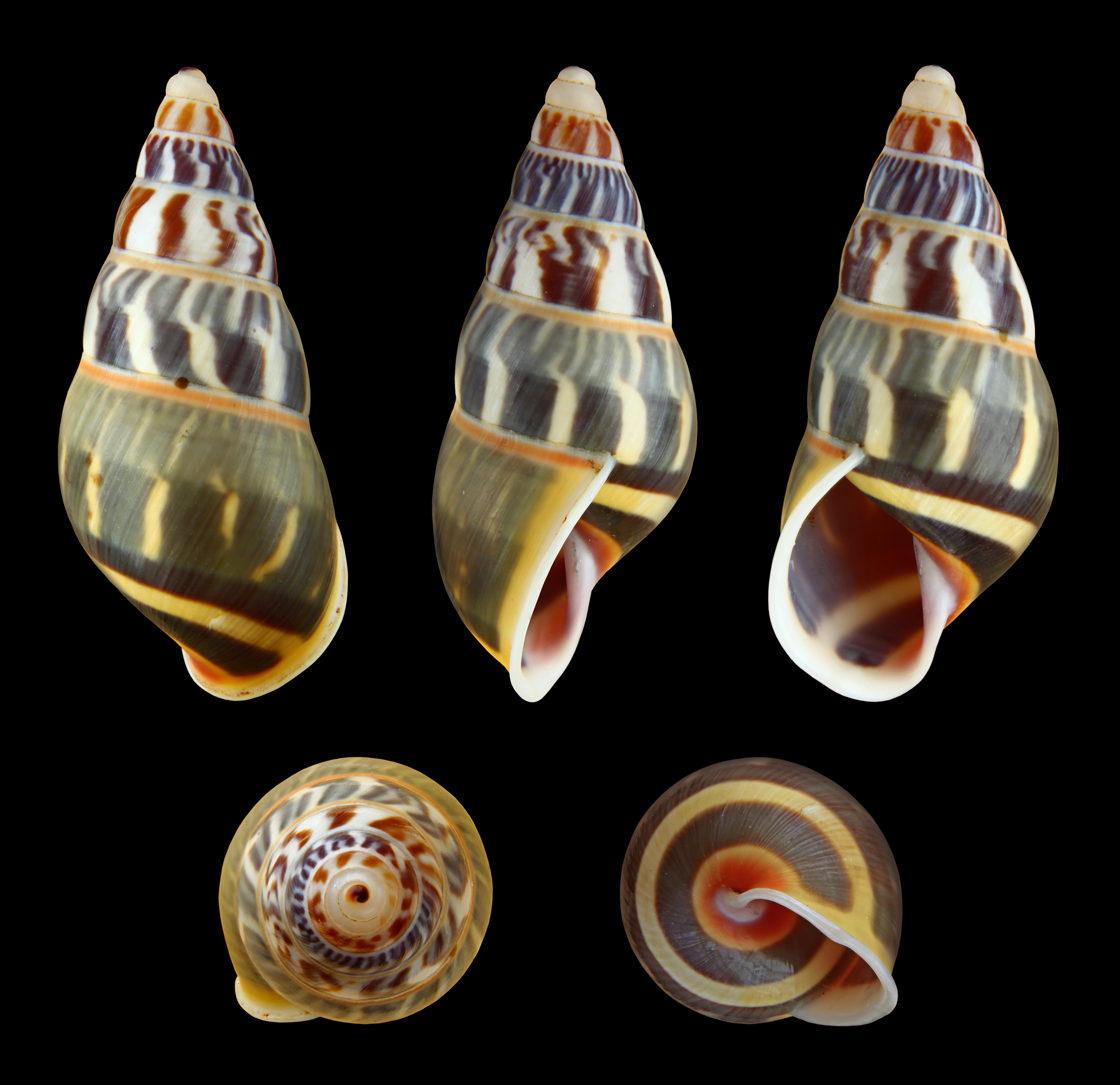
- Shell of Amphidromus everetti

Scientific classification
- Kingdom: Animalia
- Phylum: Mollusca
- Class: Gastropoda
- Order: Stylommatophora
- Family: Camaenidae
- Genus: Amphidromus
- Species: A. everetti

Binomial name
- Amphidromus everetti Fulton, 1896

= Amphidromus everetti =

Species of gastropod

Amphidromus enganoensis is a species of air-breathing land snail, a terrestrial pulmonate gastropod mollusc in the family Camaenidae.

Subspecies

- Amphidromus everetti connectens Fulton, 1896 (synonym: Amphidromus everetti var. connectens Fulton, 1896)
- Amphidromus everetti everetti Fulton, 1896

== Description ==
The length of the shell attains 40 mm, its diameter 18 mm.

(Original description) This sinistral shell is ovate-conic, with a nearly or fully obscured umbilicus and oblique striations. It comprises 6.75 slightly convex whorls. The upper whorls are yellow, marked with oblique, forked, dark brown stripes. The body whorl is nearly or entirely covered with greyish-brown. A yellow band encircles the shell below the periphery, and a narrow spiral band, either red or yellow, is present at the suture. The umbilical area is pink. The columella is erect, pale pink at its upper part, and slightly expanded. The outer lip is dark brown, expanded, and reflected.

== Distribution ==
The type species was found on Palawan, the Philippines.
