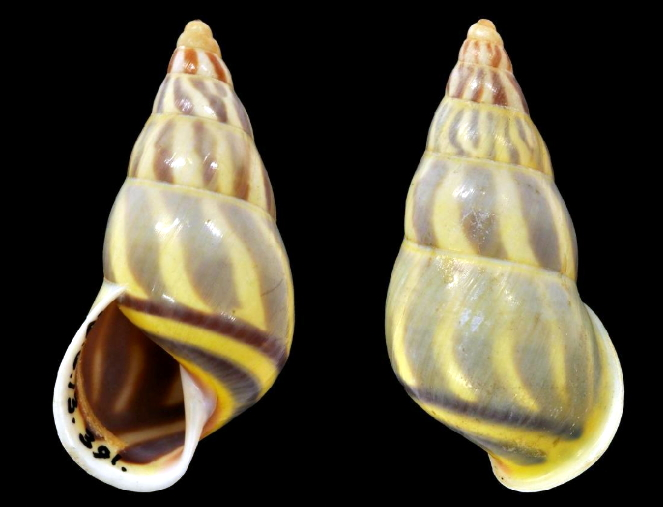
- Shell of Amphidromus pictus (lectotype at NHMUK, London)

Scientific classification
- Kingdom: Animalia
- Phylum: Mollusca
- Class: Gastropoda
- Order: Stylommatophora
- Family: Camaenidae
- Genus: Amphidromus
- Species: A. pictus

Binomial name
- Amphidromus pictus Fulton, 1896

Synonyms
- Amphidromus (Syndromus) pictus Fulton, 1896 alternative representation; Amphidromus gossi Bartsch, 1904 (junior synonym)

= Amphidromus pictus =

Species of gastropod

Amphidromus pictus is a species of air-breathing land snail, a terrestrial pulmonate gastropod mollusc in the family Camaenidae.

Subspecies

- Amphidromus pictus concinnus Fulton, 1896
- Amphidromus pictus pictus Fulton, 1896

== Description ==
The length of the shell attains 37 mm, its diameter 17 mm.

(Original description) The sinistral shell is oblong-conic, appearing almost imperforate and shining. It comprises seven convex whorls that are microscopically spirally striate and impressed at the suture. The base color is lemon, almost entirely covered by oblique broad bluish-grey stripes. The body whorl features two dark brown bands at its lower part. The columellar area presents a pink hue. The columella is straight and white, slightly expanded at its point of insertion. The outer lip appears white, expanded, and reflected. The interior of the aperture exhibits a purple-brown color. .

== Distribution ==
It is found in Sabah, Borneo.
