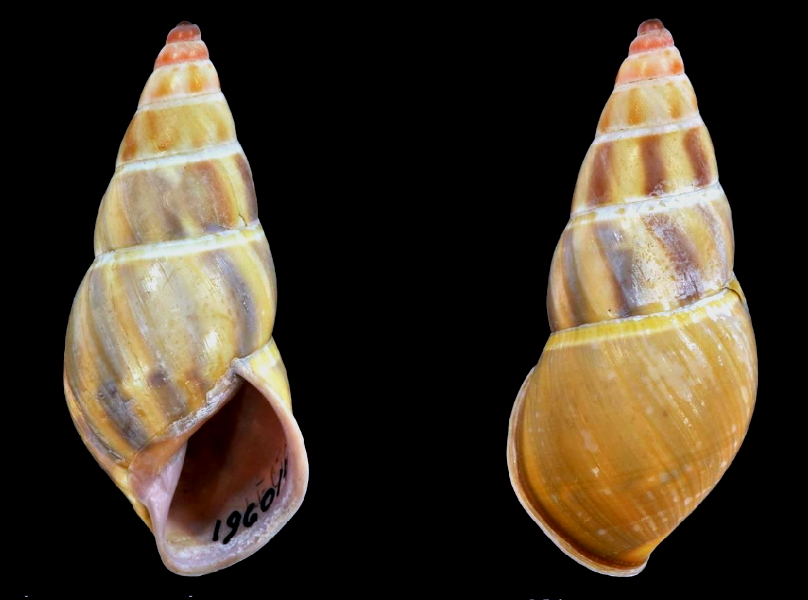
- Shell of Amphidromus glaucolarynx (lectotype at the Natural History Museum, London)

Scientific classification
- Kingdom: Animalia
- Phylum: Mollusca
- Class: Gastropoda
- Order: Stylommatophora
- Family: Camaenidae
- Genus: Amphidromus
- Species: A. glaucolarynx

Binomial name
- Amphidromus glaucolarynx (Dohrn, 1861)

Synonyms
- Amphidromus glaucolarynx albicans Möllendorff, 1902 (junior synonym); Bulimus glaucolarynx Dohrn, 1861 (original combination); Bulimus schomburgki fasciatus E. von Martens, 1867 junior objective synonym (invalid: unjustified replacement name for Bulimus glaucolarynx)

= Amphidromus glaucolarynx =

Species of gastropod

Amphidromus glaucolarynx is a species of air-breathing land snail, a terrestrial pulmonate gastropod mollusc in the family Camaenidae.

This is the only one amphidromine (left-handed and right-handed snails occur in the population) species in the subgenus Syndromus.

== Description ==
The length of the shell attains 44.2 mm, its diameter 20.1 mm.

(Original description in Latin) The shell presents a slit-like umbilicus and exhibits an ovate-turreted shape. It feels rather thin and smooth, lying under a horny yellow epidermis that is broadly streaked and banded with bluish- or purplish-brown. The spire has a conical shape and is somewhat blunt, displaying a purple coloration, rarely livid. The suture is submarginate and broadly white-banded. The shell comprisies 6-7 somewhat convex whorls. The body whorl equals 3/4 of the shell's length and is somewhat angled at the base, being encircled by a broad straw-colored band. The aperture is oblique and semi-oval, appearing effuse at the base and violet inside. The peristome is expanded and violet, with its margins joined by a thin callus.

== Distribution ==
This species occurs in Thailand.
