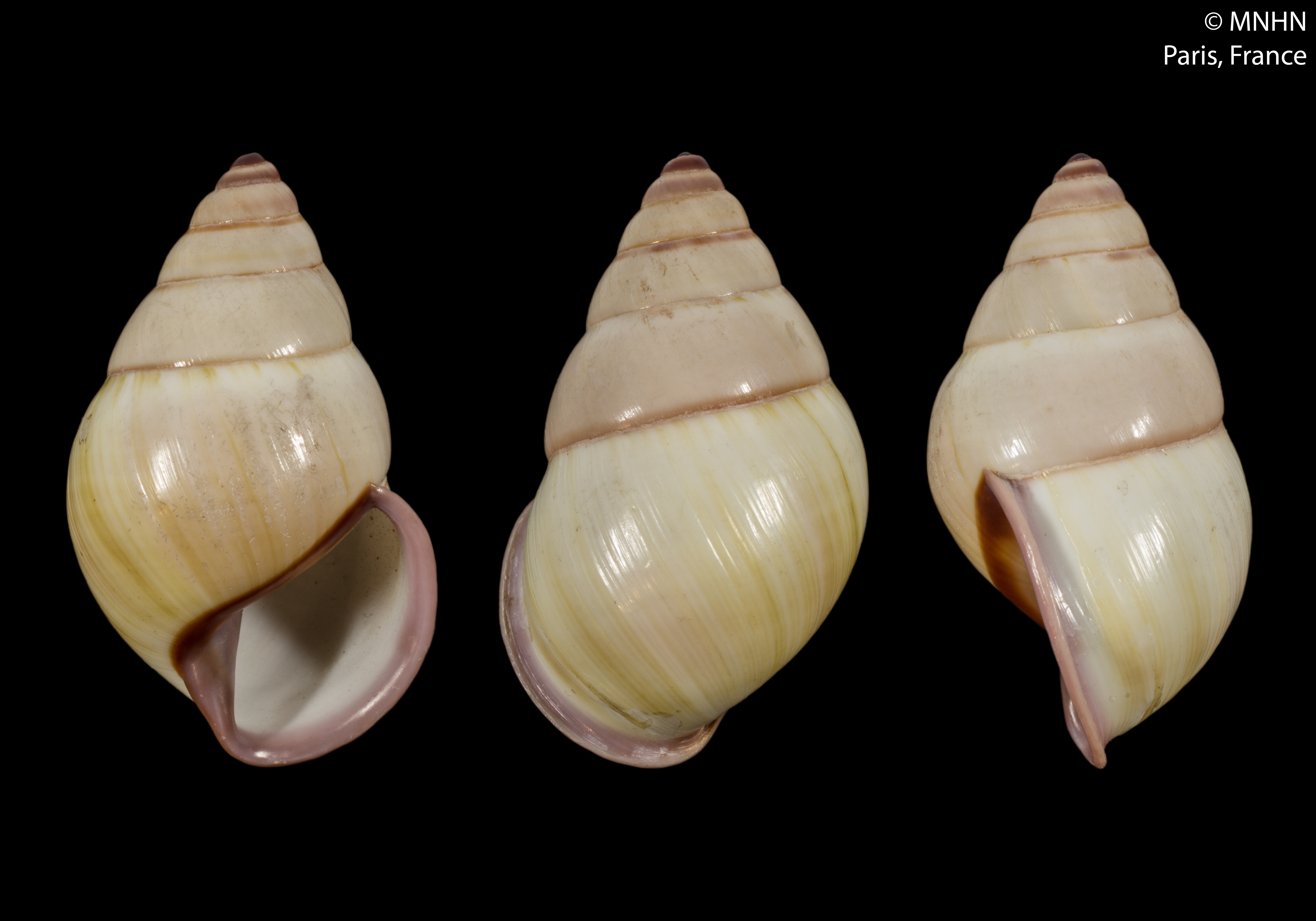
- Shell of Amphidromus schomburgki (syntype atMNHN, Paris)

Scientific classification
- Kingdom: Animalia
- Phylum: Mollusca
- Class: Gastropoda
- Order: Stylommatophora
- Family: Camaenidae
- Genus: Amphidromus
- Species: A. schomburgki

Binomial name
- Amphidromus schomburgki (Pfeiffer, 1860)

Synonyms
- Amphidromus (Amphidromus) moellendorffi Haas, 1934 (junior synonym); Amphidromus (Syndromus) friedae Thach & F. Huber, 2016; Amphidromus friedae Thach & F. Huber, 2016 (junior synonym); Amphidromus kobelti Möllendorff, 1902 (junior synonym); Amphidromus moellendorffi Haas, 1934 (junior synonym); Bulimus crossei L. Pfeiffer, 1862 (junior synonym); Bulimus schomburgki Pfeiffer, 1860 (original combination)

= Amphidromus schomburgki =

Species of gastropod

Amphidromus schomburgki is a species of air-breathing land snail, a terrestrial pulmonate gastropod mollusc in the family Camaenidae.

== Subspecies ==
- Amphidromus schomburgki dextrochlorus Sutcharit & Panha, 2006
- Amphidromus schomburgki schomburgki (Pfeiffer, 1860)

== Description ==
The length of the shell attains 48 mm, its diameter 23 mm.

(Original description in Latin) The shell is nearly imperforate and can be either dextral or sinistral. It exhibits a solid structure and a finely striated surface. It features a greenish subepidermis that appears more darkly lined and radially worn white. The spire presents a conical shape with a somewhat acute, dark violet apex. The shell contains seven somewhat convex whorls, the uppermost display violet bands, while the body whorl is shorter than the spire and tapers at the base. The columella is inflated, somewhat straight, and violet in color. The aperture lies slightly oblique and has a truncate-oval form, appearing white inside. The peristome is thickened and reflected, showing a lilac hue, with its margins joined by a blackish-chestnut callus. The columellar margin is dilated, arching-reflected, and somewhat adnate.

== Distribution ==
This species is endemic to Thailand.
