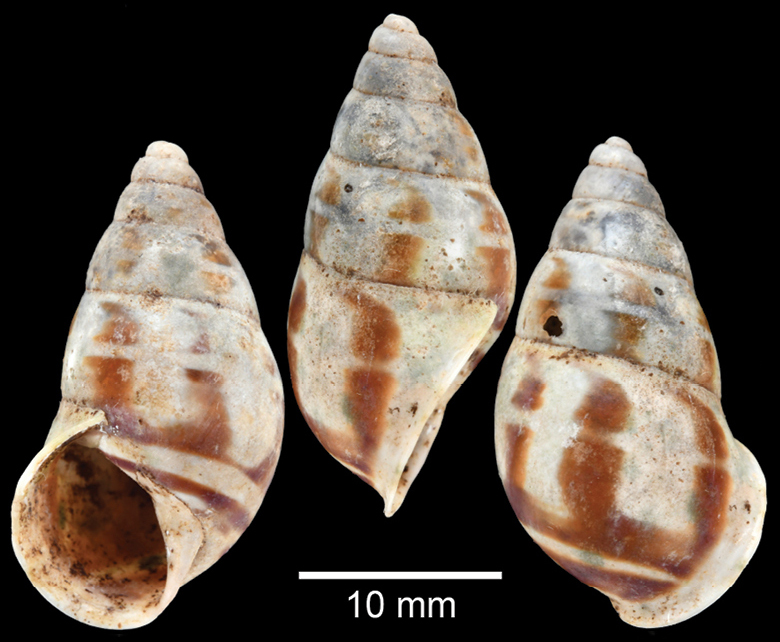

Scientific classification
- Kingdom: Animalia
- Phylum: Mollusca
- Class: Gastropoda
- Order: Stylommatophora
- Family: Camaenidae
- Genus: Amphidromus
- Species: A. semitessellatus

Binomial name
- Amphidromus semitessellatus (Morlet, 1885)

Synonyms
- Amphidromus (Syndromus) semitessellatus (Morlet, 1885) alternative representation; Bulimus (Amphidromus) semitessellatus Morlet, 1885 (basionym); Bulimus semitessellatus Morlet, 1885 (original combination); Syndromus semitessellatus (Morlet, 1885) ·

= Amphidromus semitessellatus =

Species of gastropod

Amphidromus semitessellatus is a species of air-breathing land snail, a terrestrial pulmonate gastropod mollusc in the family Camaenidae.

== Description) ==
The length of the shell attains 35 mm, its diameter 16 mm.

The sinistral shell is slightly rimate, appearing rather solid and smoothish with striatulations. Its color is pale buff, fading to white on the spire, with the initial one and a half whorls being uniformly white and minutely marked with brown at the apex. The following whorls of the spire display two spiral series of brown spots, those of the upper series appearing square or rhombic, and the lower ones elongated. The suture features a conspicuous black or purplish border below. The body whorl is uniform buff without markings other than the sutural band, or it exhibits a wide purple-black band below the periphery and another encircling the columella. The aperture is white and half-oval, with the peristome being reflexed and white. The columella appears rounded and dilated above, partially appressed, and the parietal callus is a transparent film.

== Distribution ==
This species is endemic to Cambodia.
