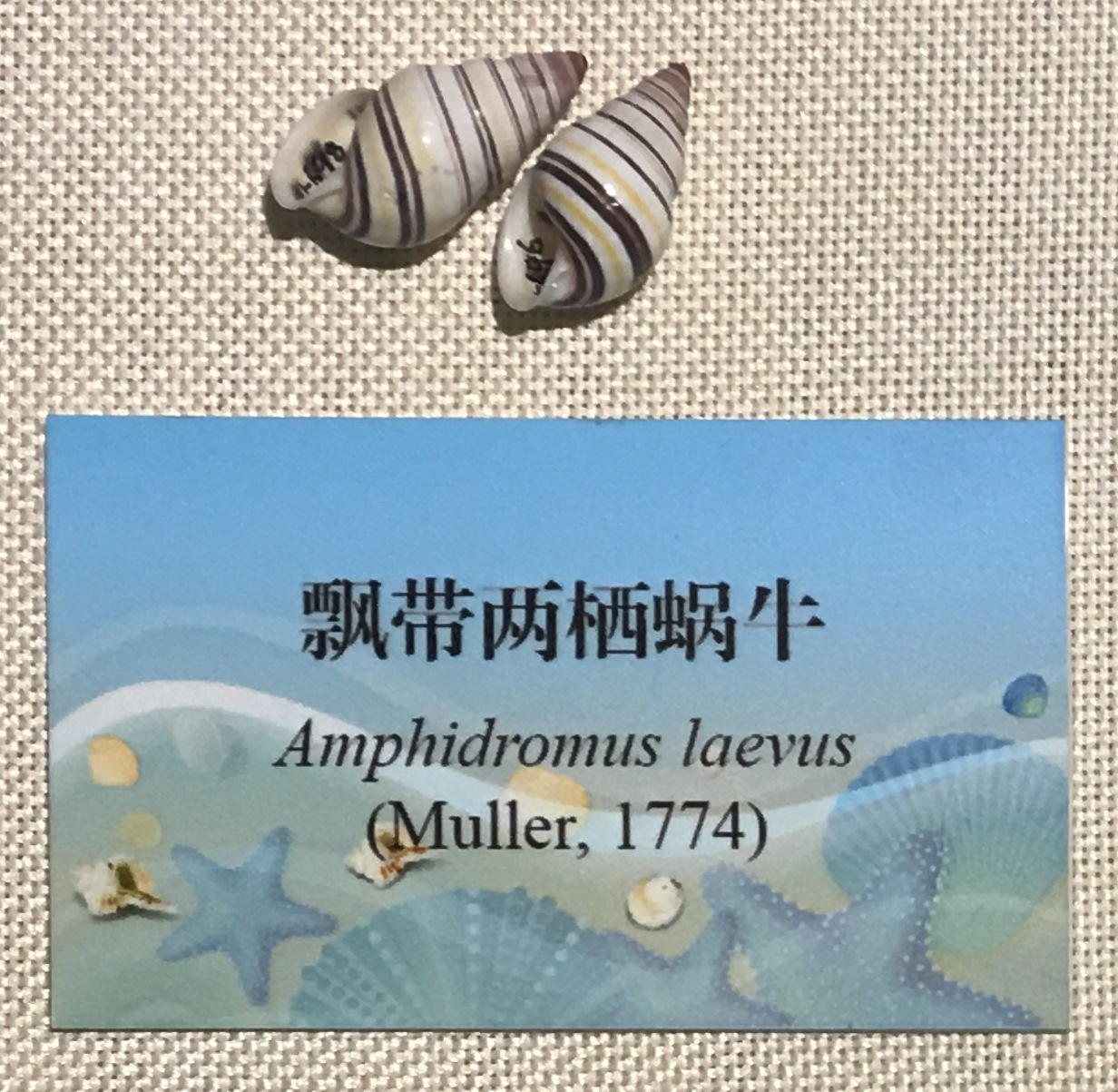

Scientific classification
- Domain: Eukaryota
- Kingdom: Animalia
- Phylum: Mollusca
- Class: Gastropoda
- Order: Stylommatophora
- Family: Camaenidae
- Genus: Amphidromus
- Species: A. laevus

Binomial name
- Amphidromus laevus (O. F. Müller, 1774)

Synonyms
- Amphidromus (Syndromus) laevus (O. F. Müller, 1774) alternative representation; Amphidromus hemicyclus Rochebrune, 1882 (uncertain synonym); Helix laeva O. F. Müller, 1774 (original combination)

= Amphidromus laevus =

Species of gastropod

Amphidromus laevus is a species of air-breathing land snail, a terrestrial pulmonate gastropod mollusk in the family Camaenidae.

Subspecies

- Amphidromus laevus janetabbasae J. Parsons, 2014
- Amphidromus laevus kissuensis Rolle, 1903
- Amphidromus laevus laevus (O. F. Müller, 1774)
- Amphidromus laevus lakorensis Thach, 2019
- Amphidromus laevus nusleti J. Parsons, 2014
- Amphidromus laevus romaensis Rolle, 1903

== Description ==
The length of the shell attains 30 mm, its diameter 10 mm.

(Original description in Latin) This species possesses a somewhat lentil-shaped, smooth, and sinistral shell. It is banded and features a somewhat reflected lip. The columella appears yellow.

(Described in Latin as Amphidromus hemicyclus) The shell is obtusely perforate, elliptically pyramidal, and semicircular, presenting a solid and very polished white surface that is encircled spirally by broad violet bands. Comprising six whorls, the penultimate appears somewhat quadrate, while the body whorl exceeds the spire and is intensely curved. The aperture is elliptical and internally acute, with a somewhat straight peristome and a reflected white lip. The columella is reflected, oblique, and curved.
