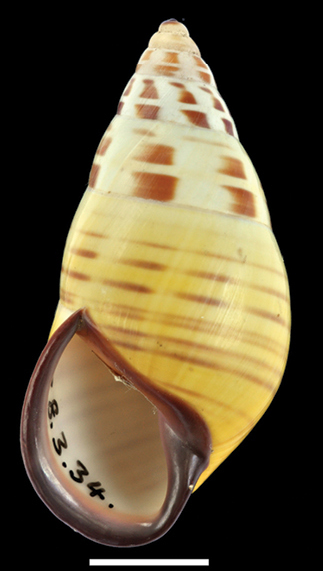
- apertural view of the shell of Amphidromus floresianus

Scientific classification
- Kingdom: Animalia
- Phylum: Mollusca
- Class: Gastropoda
- Order: Stylommatophora
- Family: Camaenidae
- Genus: Amphidromus
- Species: A. floresianus

Binomial name
- Amphidromus floresianus Fulton, 1897

Synonyms
- Amphidromus (Syndromus) floresianus Fulton, 1897 · alternative representation

= Amphidromus floresianus =

Species of gastropod

Amphidromus floresianus is a species of air-breathing land snail, a terrestrial pulmonate gastropod mollusc in the family Camaenidae.

== Description ==
(Original description) The sinistral shell is solid, imperforate and oblong-conic. It contains seven moderately convex whorls. The apex is dark brown, the second and third whorls are flesh-colored, the remaining whorls whitish towards the apex transitioning to yellow towards the base. The median whorls are ornamented with two spiral rows of irregular, squarish brown spots. The lower whorls are either plain yellow or bearing one to ten brown spiral lines, which may be continuous or interrupted. The outer lip and the lower columella are nearly black, polished, connected by a moderately thick, reddish, translucent callus. The outer lip is moderately expanded and reflected. The columella is nearly straight, exhibiting a somewhat angular appearance basally where it merges with the lip.

== Distribution ==
South Flores.
