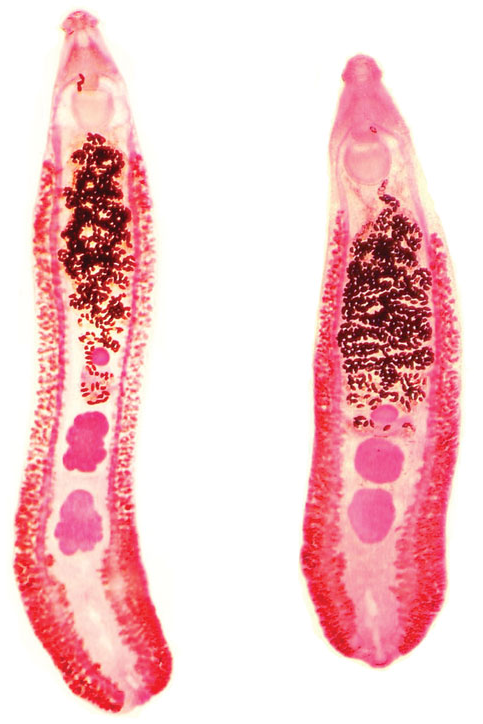
- Two specimens of Echinostoma revolutum, from

Scientific classification
- Kingdom: Animalia
- Phylum: Platyhelminthes
- Class: Trematoda
- Order: Plagiorchiida
- Family: Echinostomatidae
- Genus: Echinostoma
- Species: E. revolutum

Binomial name
- Echinostoma revolutum (Fröhlich, 1802) Looss, 1899

Synonyms
- E. armatum Barker & Irvine, 1915; E. audyi Lie & Umathevy, 1965; E. columbae Zunker, 1925; E. dilatatum (Miram, 1940) Cobbold, 1860; E. echinocephalum (Rudolphi, 1819) Cobbold, 1860; E. erraticum Lutz, 1924; E. ivaniosi Mahandas, 1973; E. limicoli Johnson, 1920; E. mendax Dietz, 1909; E. microrchis Lutz, 1924; E. neglectum Lutz, 1924; E. nephrocystis Lutz, 1924; E. oxycephalum (Rudolphi, 1819) Railliet, 1896; E. revolutum tenuicollis Bashikirova, 1941; E. revolutum var. japonicum Kurisu, 1932; E. stromi Bashikirova, 1946; E. sudanense Odhner, 1910

= Echinostoma revolutum =

Species of fluke

Echinostoma revolutum is a trematode parasite of which the adults can infect birds and mammals, including humans. In humans, it causes echinostomiasis.

== Distribution ==
Echinostoma revolutum is the most widely distributed species of the known 20 Echinostomatidae species; it is found in Asia, Oceania, Europe, and the Americas. In Asian countries the disease is endemic to humans. Outbreaks have been reported in North America after travellers returned from Kenya and Tanzania.

== Description ==
The worms are leaflike, elongated, and an average of 8.8 mm long (8.0–9.5 mm) and 1.7 mm wide (1.2–2.1 mm). When first passed in the feces, they were pinkish red and coiled in a "c" or "e" shape. The eggs in uteri were an average of 105 μm long (97–117 μm) and 63 μm wide (61–65 μm).

== Life cycle ==
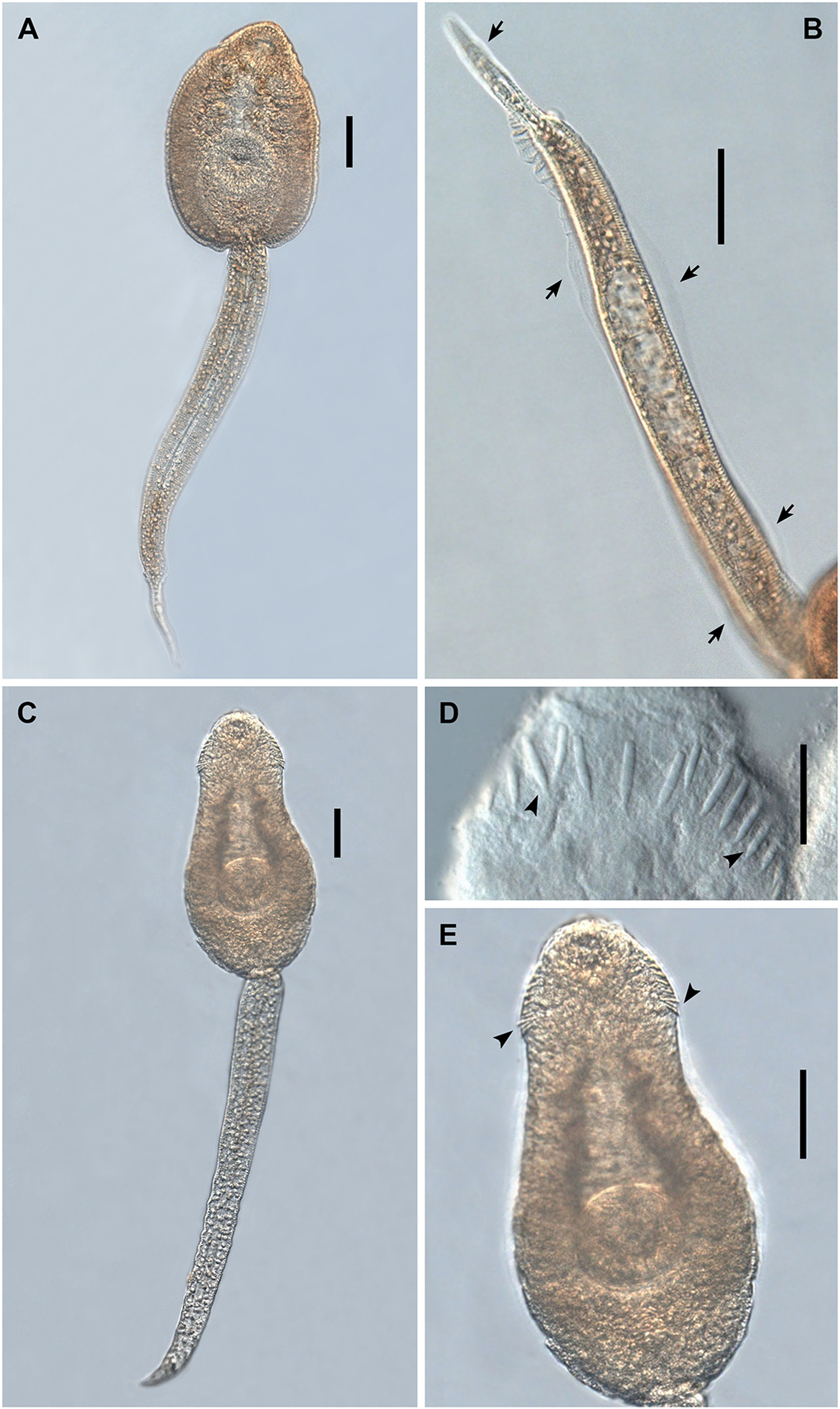
Cercariae of Echinostoma revolutum from snails

Infection of Echinostoma revolutum usually results from ingestion of raw snails or frogs that serve as an intermediate host. This parasite is predominantly found throughout North America. Two asexual generations occur in a snail or mollusc. The first snail host is penetrated by a miracidium, producing a sporocyst. Many sporocysts are produced and mother rediae emerge. Mother rediae asexually reproduce daughter rediae, which also multiply. Each rediae then develop into a cercariae, which penetrates a second host. The second host could be another snail or a tadpole, in which development into metacercaria occurs. Cercariae typically find a snail host through chemotaxis. The cercariae are attracted to the slime of the snail, which contains small peptides. The first larval stage is the miracidium, and are found to be attracted to macromolecular glycoconjugates associated with a possible snail host. Environmental stimuli such as light and gravity can also be used to assist in searching for a host.

=== Intermediate hosts ===
Intermediate hosts of Echinostoma revolutum include:

- Anentome helena (formerly Clea helena)
- Bithynia funiculata
- Bithynia siamensis siamensi
- Corbicula producta
- Eyriesia eyriesi
- Filopaludina sumatrensis polygramma
- Filopaludina martensi martensi
- Filopaludina spp.
- Idiopoma doliaris (formerly Filopaludina doliaris)
- Lymnaea stagnalis
- Lymnaea sp. in Thailand
- Physa occidentalis
- Radix auricularia

== In humans ==
=== Prevalence ===
The prevalence of Echinostoma revolutum trematodes in Taiwan, from the first reported human infection in 1929 through 1979, varied from 0.11% to 0.65%. Small clusters and individual cases of human infection were discovered in the People's Republic of China, Indonesia, and Thailand until 1994, after which no data is available. In 2007 a fecal survey in 4 primary schools in Pursat Province, Cambodia found an infection rate amongst students to be between 7.5% to 22.4%.

In Pursat Province, Cambodia, children eating undercooked snails or clams were identified as a possible source of infection in humans.

=== Symptoms ===
Signs of infection in humans due to this type of fluke can result to weakness and emaciation. In cases where infection is heavy, hemorrhagic enteritis can occur.

=== Diagnosis ===
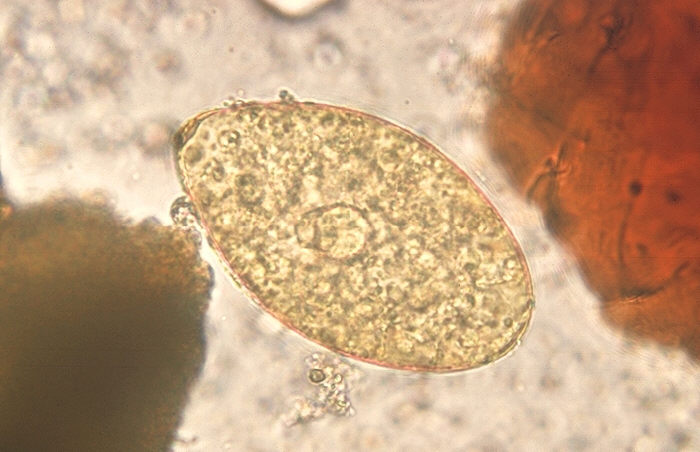
Unstained Echinostoma egg.

An Echinostoma infection can be diagnosed by observing the parasite eggs in the faeces of an infected individual, under a microscope. Methods such as the Kato-Katz procedure can be used to do this. The eggs typically have a yellow-brown appearance, and are ellipsoid in shape. To confirm which species is causing the infection adult worms must be recovered from the infected individual, such as with anthelmintic treatment.

=== Prevention ===
Echinostomiasis can be controlled at the same time as other food-borne parasite infections, using existing control programmes. Interrupting the parasite's lifecycle by efficient diagnosis and subsequent treatment of infected individuals, and preventing reinfection, may help to control this disease. As echinostomiasis is acquired through the consumption of raw or undercooked infected food, cooking food thoroughly will prevent infection.

=== Treatment ===
Praziquantel is typically prescribed to rid the parasite from the body. Alternatively, mebandazole has been used to treat echinostomiasis. Albendazole has been reported to show effective results although without details on the dosage and cure rates.
