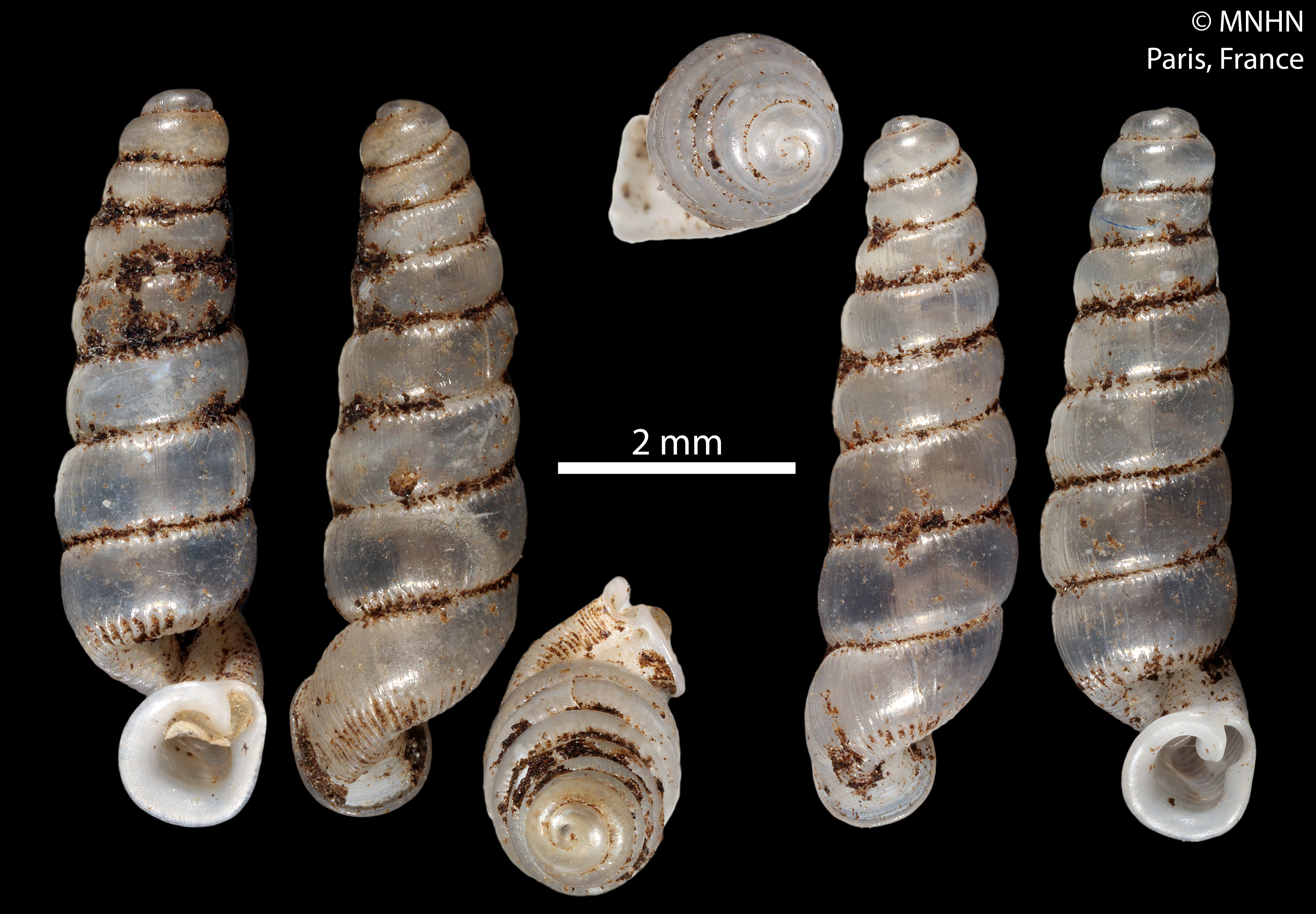
- Shell of Diaphera prima (paratype at MNHN, Paris)

Scientific classification
- Kingdom: Animalia
- Phylum: Mollusca
- Class: Gastropoda
- Order: Stylommatophora
- Family: Diapheridae
- Genus: Diaphera
- Species: D. prima

Binomial name
- Diaphera prima Panha, 2010

= Diaphera prima =

Species of gastropod

Diaphera prima is a species of air-breathing land snail, a terrestrial pulmonate gastropod mollusk in the family Diapheridae.

The specific name prima (Latin for first) indicates that it is the first species of Diaphera confirmed in Thailand.

== Distribution ==
The type locality of Diaphera prima is Khao Cha Ang-Oan, Bor Thong, Chonburi Province, Thailand.

Distribution of Diaphera prima include Eastern Thailand: Chonburi Province and Rayong Province.

== Description ==
The shell of Diaphera prima is oblong. The shell has 7-8 whorls. The sculpture of the shell is smooth with short ribs below the suture. The apex of the shell is obtuse and smooth. The aperture is rounded with parietal lamella, basal lamella, columellar lamella and with two palatal lamellae.

The width of the shell of the holotype is 2 mm. The height of the shell of the holotype is 6.2 mm.

The body of the animal is a pale greenish yellow in color.
