= Laoennea renouardi =

Scientific classification
- Kingdom: Animalia
- Phylum: Mollusca
- Class: Gastropoda
- Order: Stylommatophora
- Family: Diapheridae
- Genus: Laoennea
- Species: L. renouardi

Binomial name
- Laoennea renouardi Jochum & Wackenheim, 2020

Species of gastropod

Three views of the shell of Laoennea renouardi (from Jochum et al. 2020).

Laoennea renouardi is one of two species in the genus Laoennea of the Asian terrestrial snail family Diapheridae.

== Description ==
The shell has a height of 1.8 mm and a width of 1 mm. The white, glossy, transparent shell is compact and less elongated with fewer whorls compared to Laoennea carychioides. The apical part of the shell is dome-shaped. The conical-ovate shell possesses five convex whorls, which are separated by a deep suture. The next-to-last whorl is expanded and broader than the last whorl. The protoconch is not clearly discernible. The teleoconch shows streaks of uneven growth lines. The last whorl shows widely spaced ribs and radial striations. The opening (aperture) is heart-shaped, which is reinforced by a thick callus. The apertural dentition consists of two well-formed denticles, one on the palatal wall and the other one (parietal lamella) on the parietal wall, forming a round sinulus. The sinulus is in line with the rest of the aperture. Additionally, a low, weak columellar denticle is located close to the peristome. The peristome is expanded and slightly reflected. The shell has a straight central column (columella) and the umbilicus is visible as a small slit.

== Distribution ==
Laoennea renouardi is only known from the Tham Houey Yè cave, which is located within the Vang Vieng karst region in Laos. The region comprises numerous cavities formed in Upper Permian Limestone and harbours 11.2 km of galleries.

== Taxonomy ==
The species Laoennea renouardi is named after the French caver, Louis Renouard, who explored and mapped the only two caves in Laos known to harbor this group of tiny snails.

== Discovery ==
{{Laoennea renouardi was discovered by Marina Ferrand of the French Club Etude et Exploration des Gouffres et Carrières (EEGC), during the Phouhin Namno caving expedition in Tham Houey Yè cave in Laos in March 2019. The shells were collected 150 m from the cave entrance in a horizontal gallery usually flooded during the rainy season.

Dr. Adrienne Jochum affiliated with the Natural History Museum of Bern, Switzerland, the Senckenberg Research Institute and the Natural History Museum of Frankfurt, Germany described the new species and its cave habitat together with Quentin Wackenheim (Laboratoire de Géographie Physique (Meudon, France) and Laboratoire Trajectoires (Nanterre, France)).

== Ecology ==
Collected shells have been discovered 150 m from Tham Houey Yè cave entrance. Thus, it is not yet clear if Laoennea is a cave-dwelling genus or not. The lack of pigment in the shells suggests that the species lives underground.

== Conservation ==
Tham Houey Yè is located very close to a long-time popular tourist cave, Tham Pha Leusi. In 2001 Tham Houey Yè was opened for tourists, but direct tourist activity ended a few year later due to difficult access to the cave caused by the narrow opening. It was pointed out that the wear and tear impact associated with tourism and potentially polluted runoff draining in the cave could pose threats to the species.
