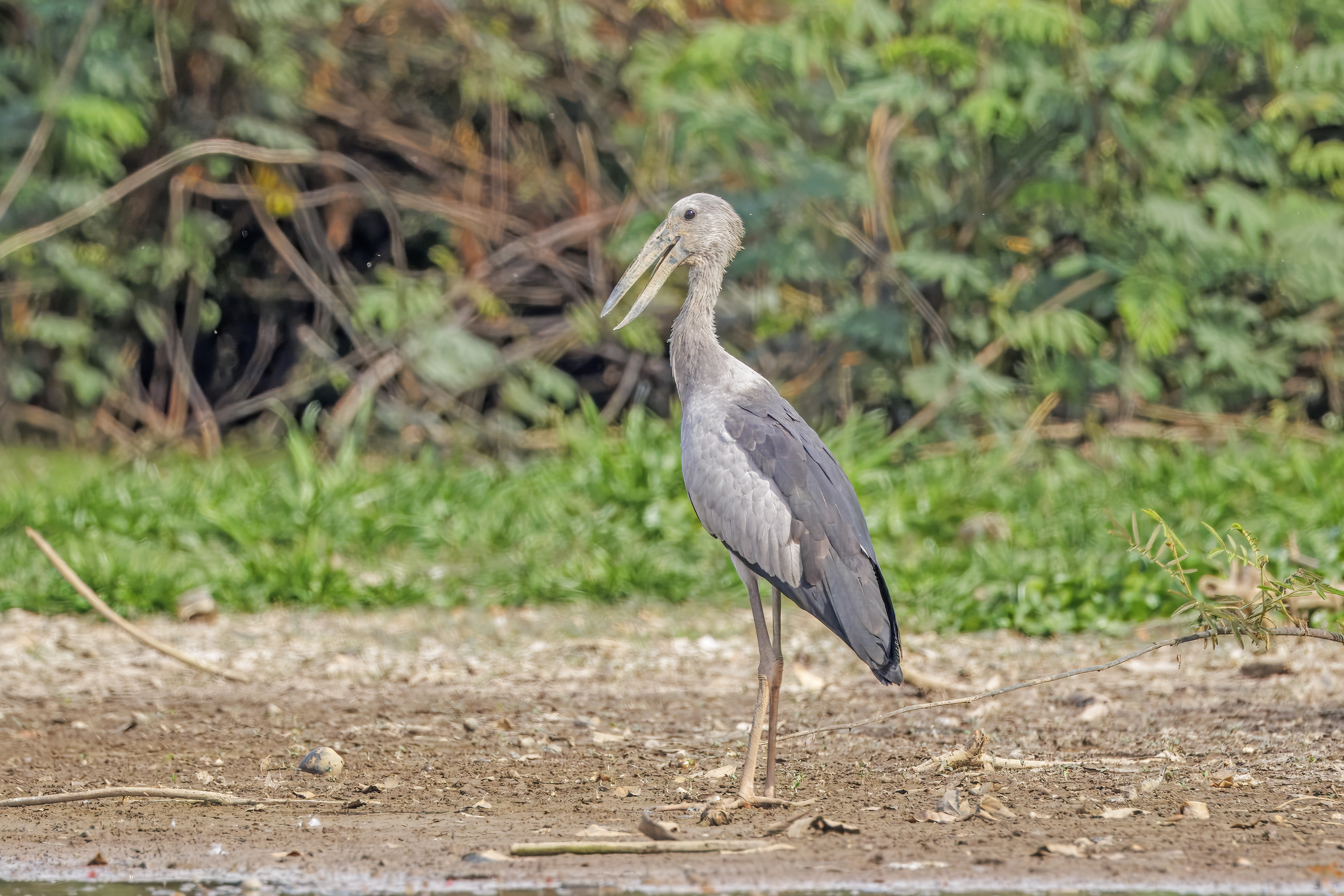
- Young bird in Cambodia

Conservation status
- Least Concern (IUCN 3.1)

Scientific classification
- Kingdom: Animalia
- Phylum: Chordata
- Class: Aves
- Order: Ciconiiformes
- Family: Ciconiidae
- Genus: Anastomus
- Species: A. oscitans

Binomial name
- Anastomus oscitans (Boddaert, 1783)
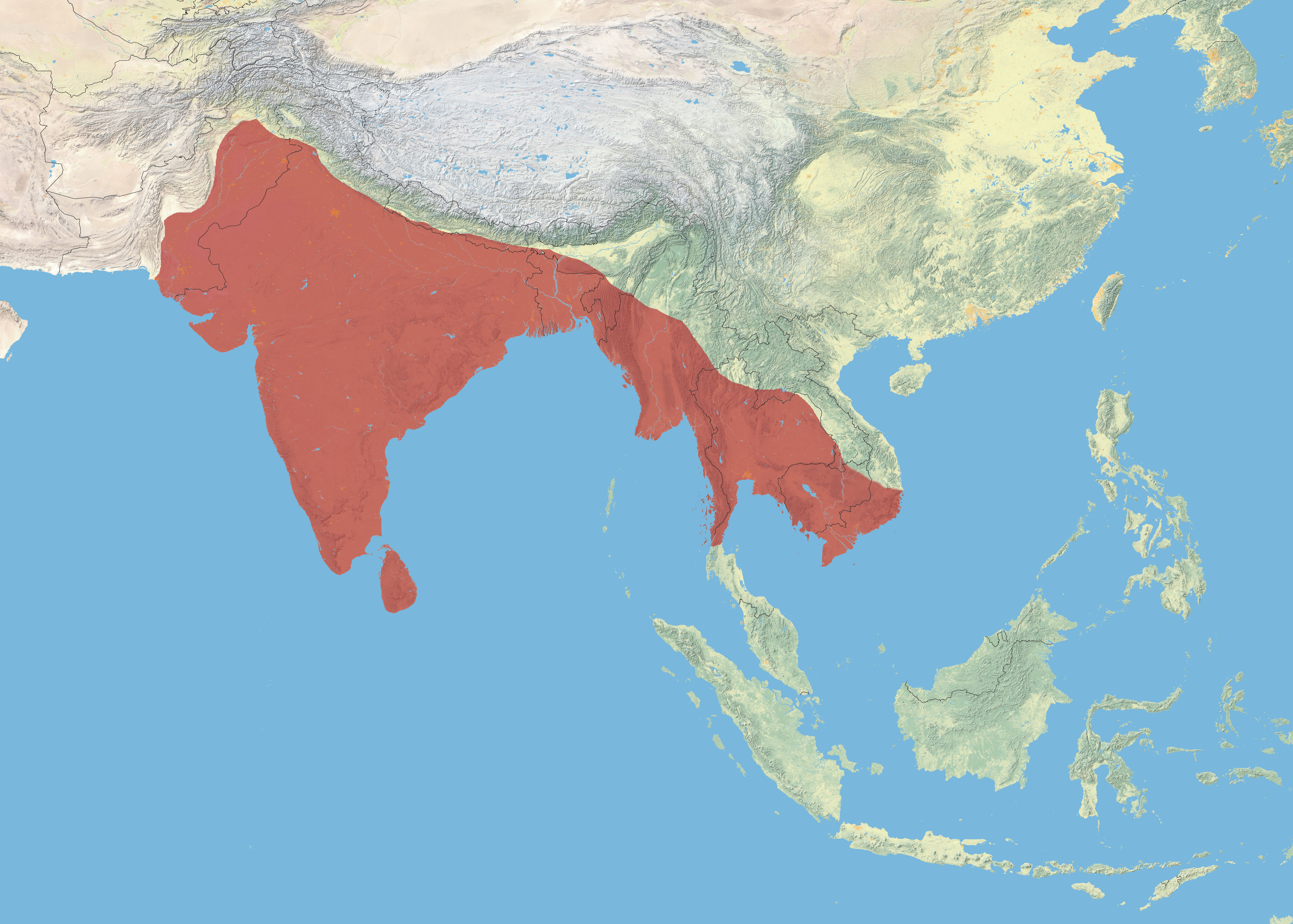
- range

= Asian openbill =

Species of bird

The Asian openbill or Asian openbill stork (Anastomus oscitans) is a large wading bird in the stork family Ciconiidae. This distinctive stork is found mainly in the Indian subcontinent and Southeast Asia. It is greyish or white with glossy black wings and tail. Adults have a gap between the arched upper mandible and recurved lower mandible which is thought to be an adaptation that aids in the handling of snails, their main prey. Young birds are born without this gap. Although resident within their range, they make long distance movements in response to weather and food availability.

== Taxonomy ==
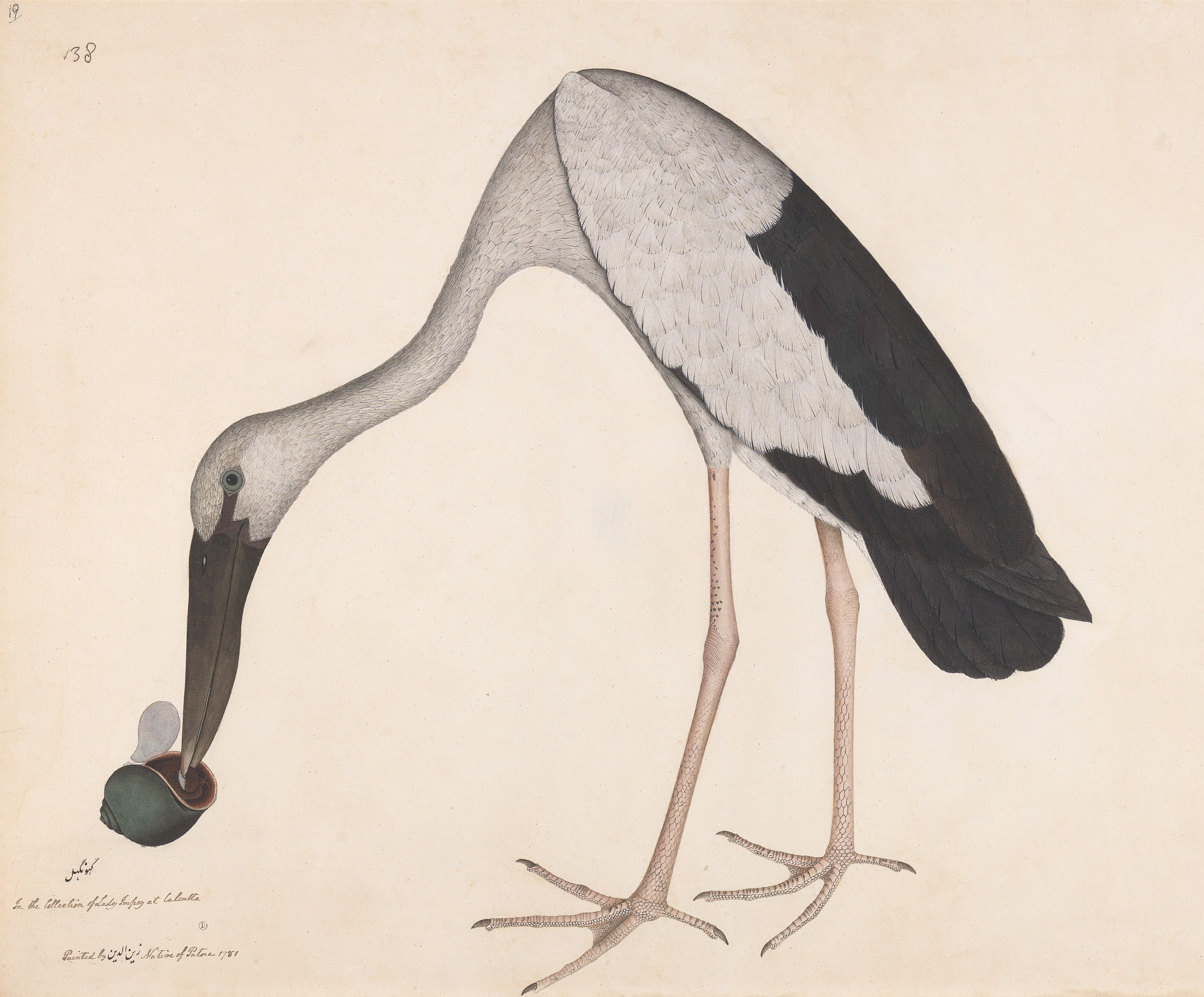
1781 illustration by Sheikh Zainuddin

The Asian openbill was described by the French polymath Georges-Louis Leclerc, Comte de Buffon in 1780 in his Histoire Naturelle des Oiseaux from a specimen collected in Pondichery, India. The bird was also illustrated in a hand-coloured plate engraved by François-Nicolas Martinet in the Planches Enluminées D'Histoire Naturelle which was produced under the supervision of Edme-Louis Daubenton to accompany Buffon's text. Neither the plate caption nor Buffon's description included a scientific name but in 1783 the Dutch naturalist Pieter Boddaert coined the binomial name Ardea oscitans in his catalogue of the Planches Enluminées. The Asian openbill is now placed in the genus Anastomus that was erected by the French naturalist Pierre Bonnaterre in 1791. The genus name Anastomus is from the Ancient Greek αναστομοω anastomoō meaning "to furnish with a mouth" or "with mouth wide-opened". The specific epithet oscitans is the Latin word for "yawning".

== Description ==
The Asian openbill stork is predominantly greyish (non-breeding season) or white (breeding season) with glossy black wings and tail that have a green or purple sheen. The name is derived from the distinctive gap formed between the recurved lower and arched upper mandible of the beak in adult birds. Young birds do not have this gap. The cutting edges of the mandible have a fine brush like structure that is thought to give them better grip on the shells of snails. The tail consists of twelve feathers and the preen gland has a tuft. The mantle is black and the bill is horn-grey. At a distance, they can appear somewhat like a white stork or Oriental stork. The short legs are pinkish to grey, reddish prior to breeding. Non-breeding birds have a smoky grey wings and back instead of white. Young birds are brownish-grey and have a brownish mantle. Like other storks, the Asian openbill is a broad-winged soaring bird, which relies on moving between thermals of hot air for sustained flight. They are usually found in flocks but single birds are not uncommon. Like all storks, it flies with its neck outstretched. It is relatively small for a stork and stands at 68 cm height (81 cm long).

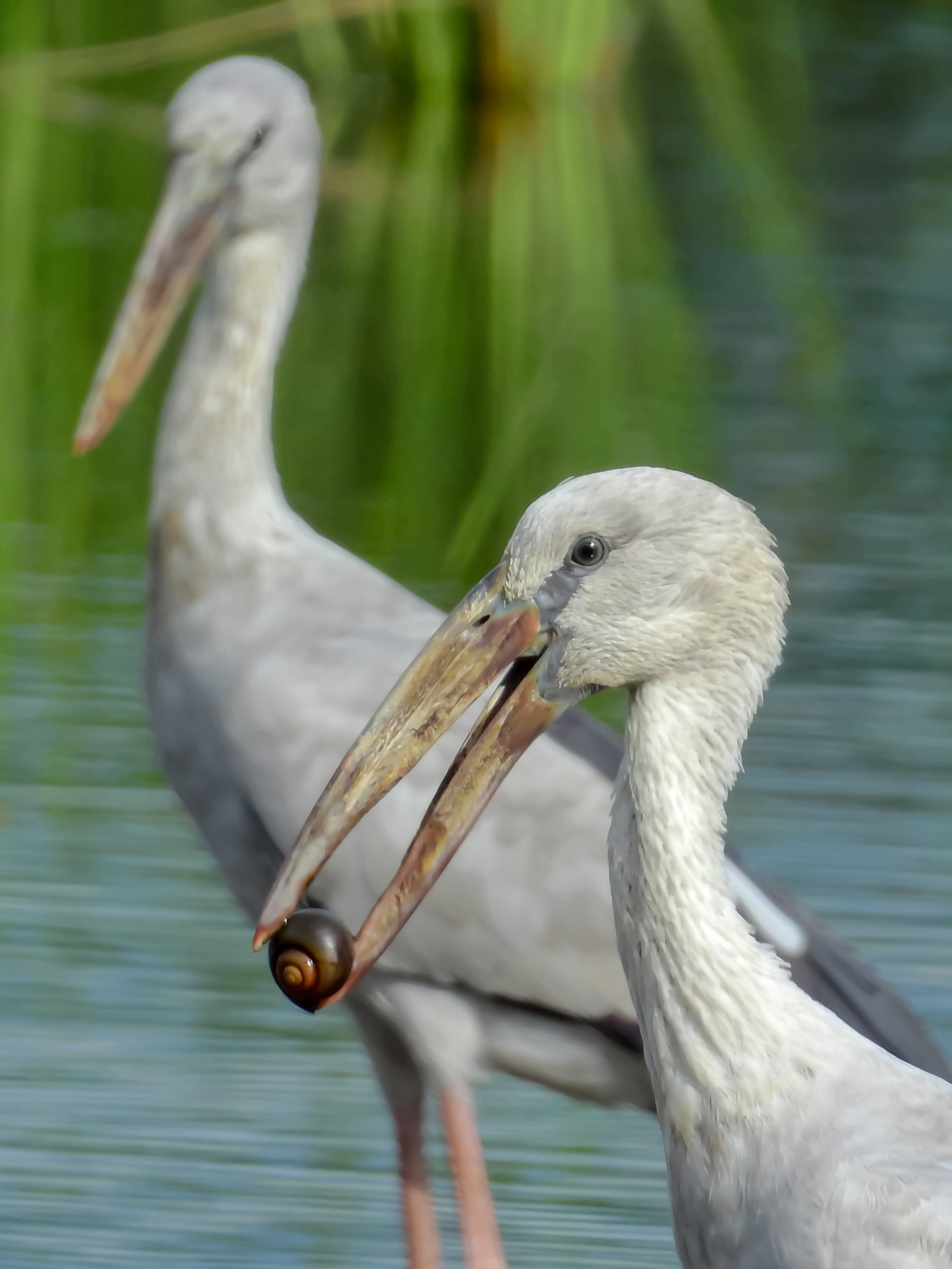
Holding a snail

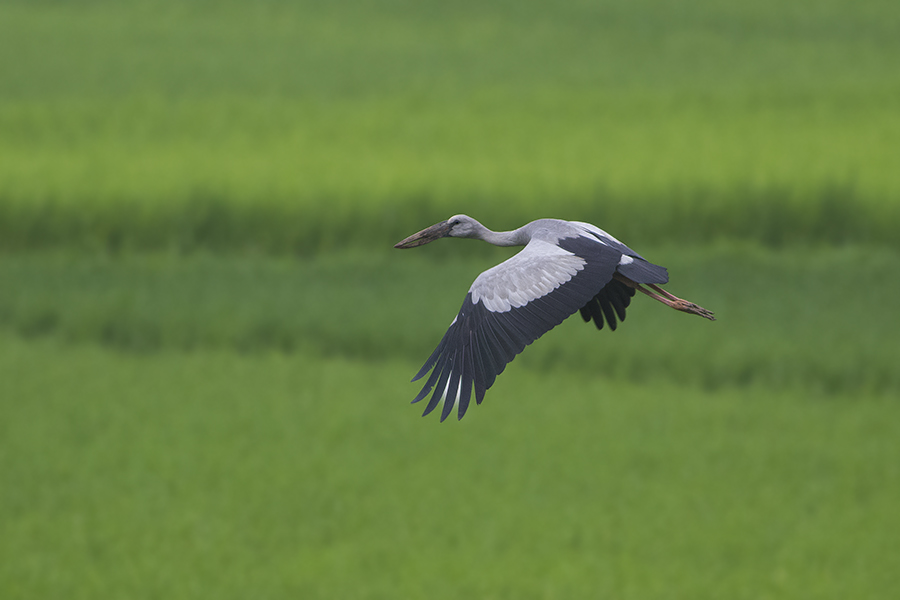
In flight over marsh habitat

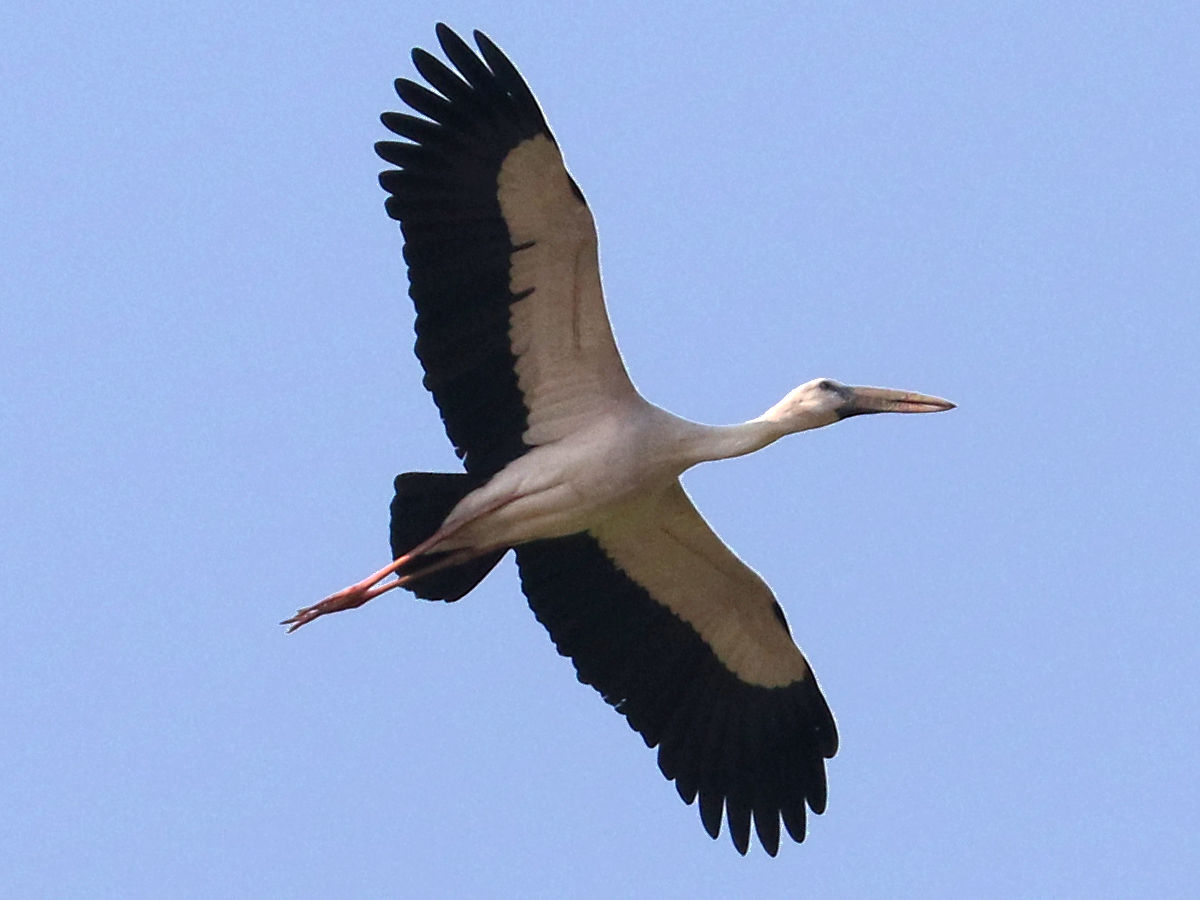
In flight from below, Thailand

== Habitat and distribution ==
The usual foraging habitats are inland wetlands, and they are only rarely seen along river banks and tidal flats. On agricultural landscapes, birds forage in crop fields, irrigation canals, and in seasonal marshes. Birds may move widely in response to habitat conditions. Young birds also disperse widely after fledging. Individuals ringed at Bharatpur in India have been recovered 800 km east and a bird ringed in Thailand has been recovered 1500 km west in Bangladesh. Storks are regularly disoriented by lighthouses along the southeast coast of India on overcast nights between August and September. The species is very rare in the Sind and Punjab regions of Pakistan, but widespread and common in India, Sri Lanka, Nepal, Bangladesh, Myanmar, Thailand and Cambodia. It has recently expanded its range into southwestern China. In Thirunavaya Lotus Lake Wetland Malappuram district of Kerala state in India, they are mostly seen in September to February.

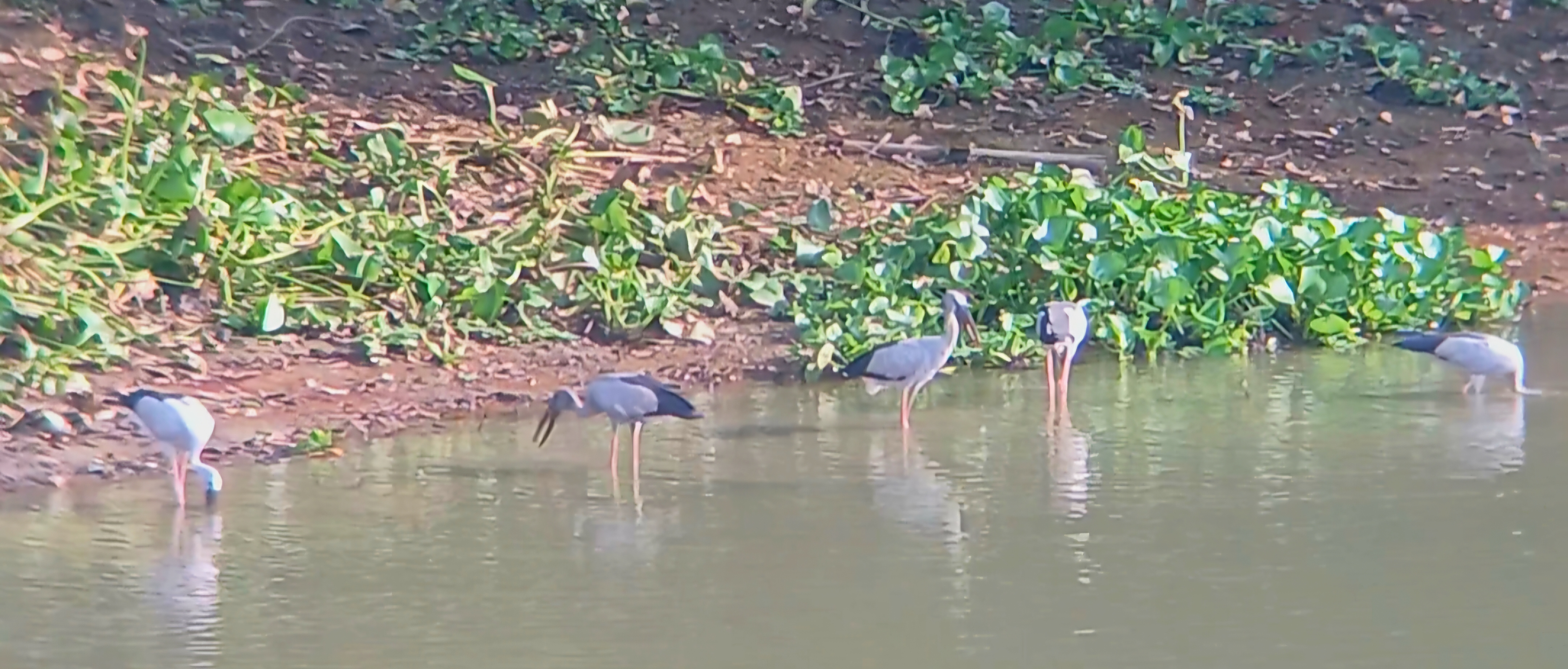
Kaziranga National Park

Asian openbills appear to be susceptible to dying during hailstorms. In Xishuangbanna, in south China, 45 Asian openbills were counted dead after a hailstorm, whereas carcasses of other bird species were not seen.

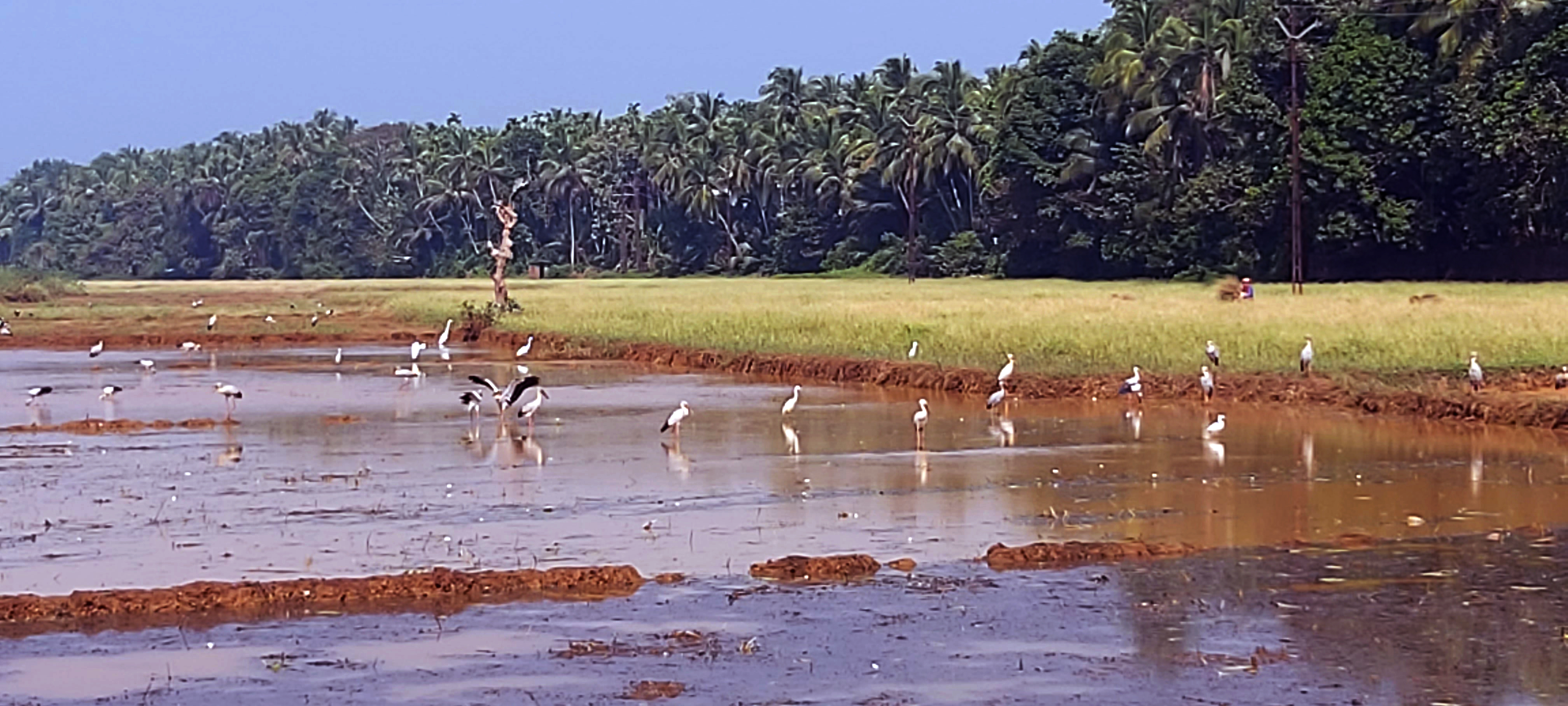
Asian openbill in Thirunavaya Lotus Lake Wetland

== Food and foraging ==
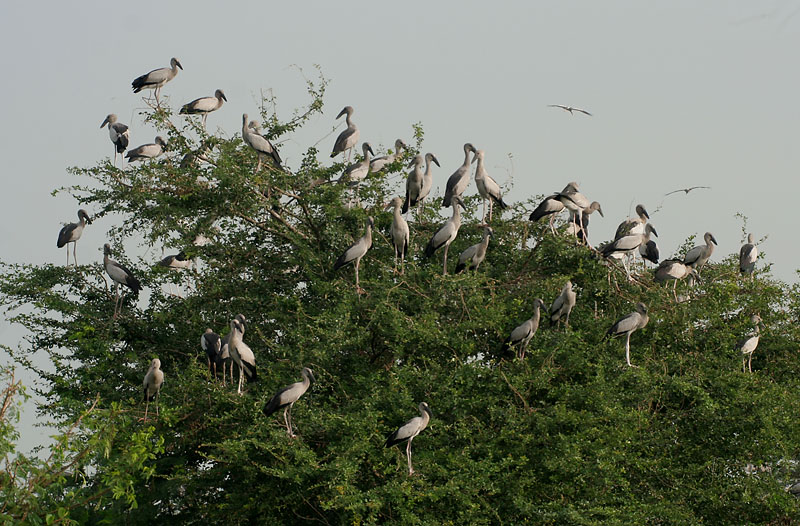
Nest colony (India)

During the warmer part of the day, Asian openbills soar on thermals and have a habit of descending rapidly into their feeding areas. Groups may forage together in close proximity in shallow water or marshy ground on which they may walk with a slow and steady gait. The Asian openbill feeds mainly on large molluscs, especially Pila species, and they separate the shell from the body of the snail using the tip of the beak. The tip of the lower mandible of the beak is often twisted to the right. This tip is inserted into the opening of the snail and the body is extracted with the bill still under water. Jerdon noted that they were able to capture snails even when blindfolded. The exact action being difficult to see led to considerable speculation on the method used. Sir Julian Huxley examined the evidence from specimens and literature and came to the conclusion that the bill gap was used like a nutcracker. He held the rough edges of the bill as being the result of wear and tear from such actions. Subsequent studies have dismissed this idea, and the rough edge of the bill has been suggested as being an adaptation to help handle hard and slippery shells. The birds forage for prey by holding their bill tips slightly apart and make rapid vertical jabs in shallow water, often with the head and neck partially submerged. The gap in the bill is not used for handling snail shells and forms only with age. Young birds that lack a gap are still able to forage on snails. It has been suggested that the gap allows the tips to strike at a greater angle to increases the force that the tips can apply on snail shells. Smaller snails are often swallowed whole or crushed. At one location in Thailand, Asian openbills feeding on Pomacea canaliculata discarded the male's testes and female's albumen glands. They also feed on water snakes, frogs and large insects. When foraging on agricultural landscapes with a variety of habitats, Asian openbills preferentially use natural marshes and lakes (especially in the monsoon and winter) and irrigation canals (especially in the summer) as foraging habitat.

== Breeding ==
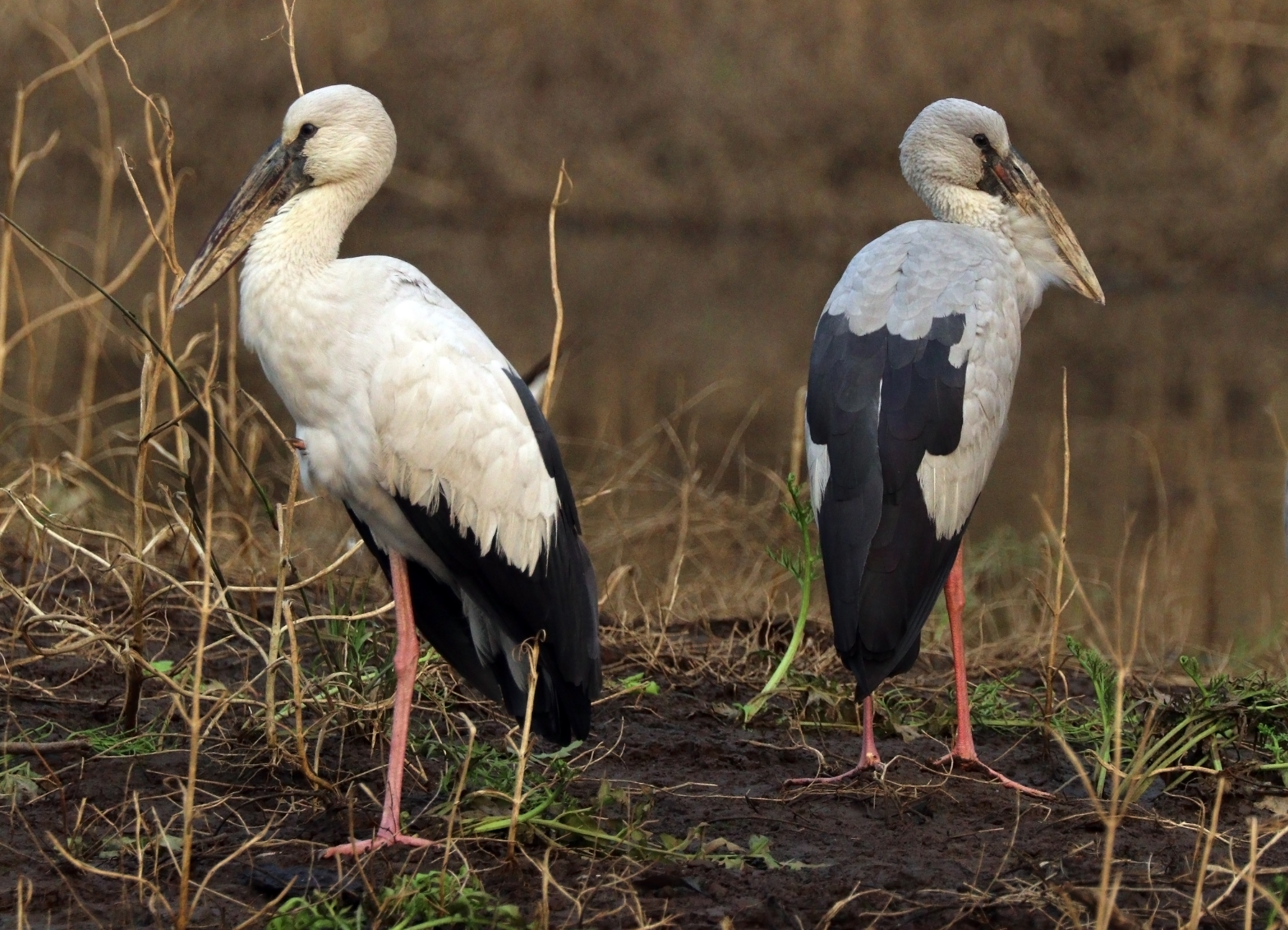
Juvenile on the right. The gap between the mandibles develops with age.

The breeding season is after the rains, during July to September in northern India and Nepal, and November to March in southern India and Sri Lanka. They may skip breeding in drought years. The Asian openbill breeds colonially, building a rough platform of sticks often on half-submerged trees (often Barringtonia, Avicennia and Acacia species), typically laying two to four eggs. The nesting trees are either shared with egrets, cormorants and darters, or can be single-species colonies, as in lowland Nepal. Nesting colonies are sometimes in highly disturbed areas such as inside villages and on trees located in crop fields. Colonies are also found in small cities such as Udaipur in Rajassthan, India, which has several large artificial wetlands within the city limits. In lowland Nepal, 13 colonies found in an agricultural landscape had an average colony size of 52, ranging from 5 nests to 130 nests. The majority of these colonies were located on Bombax ceiba trees, with much fewer located on Ficus religiosa and Dalbergia sissoo. Asian openbills preferred trees that were much taller and bigger than trees that were available on the landscape, and selectively used wild and native tree species, entirely avoiding species that were important for resources such as fruits (e.g. Mangifera indica), despite such trees being much more common. Religious beliefs have secured important trees such as Ficus species, and agro-forestry has secured the most preferred species, Bombax ceiba, that Asian openbills prefer for nesting colonies in lowland Nepal. The nests are close to each other, leading to considerable aggressive interactions between birds on neighbouring nests. Both parents take turns in incubation, the eggs hatching after about 25 days. The chicks emerge with cream-coloured down and are shaded by the loosely outspread and drooped wings of a parent.

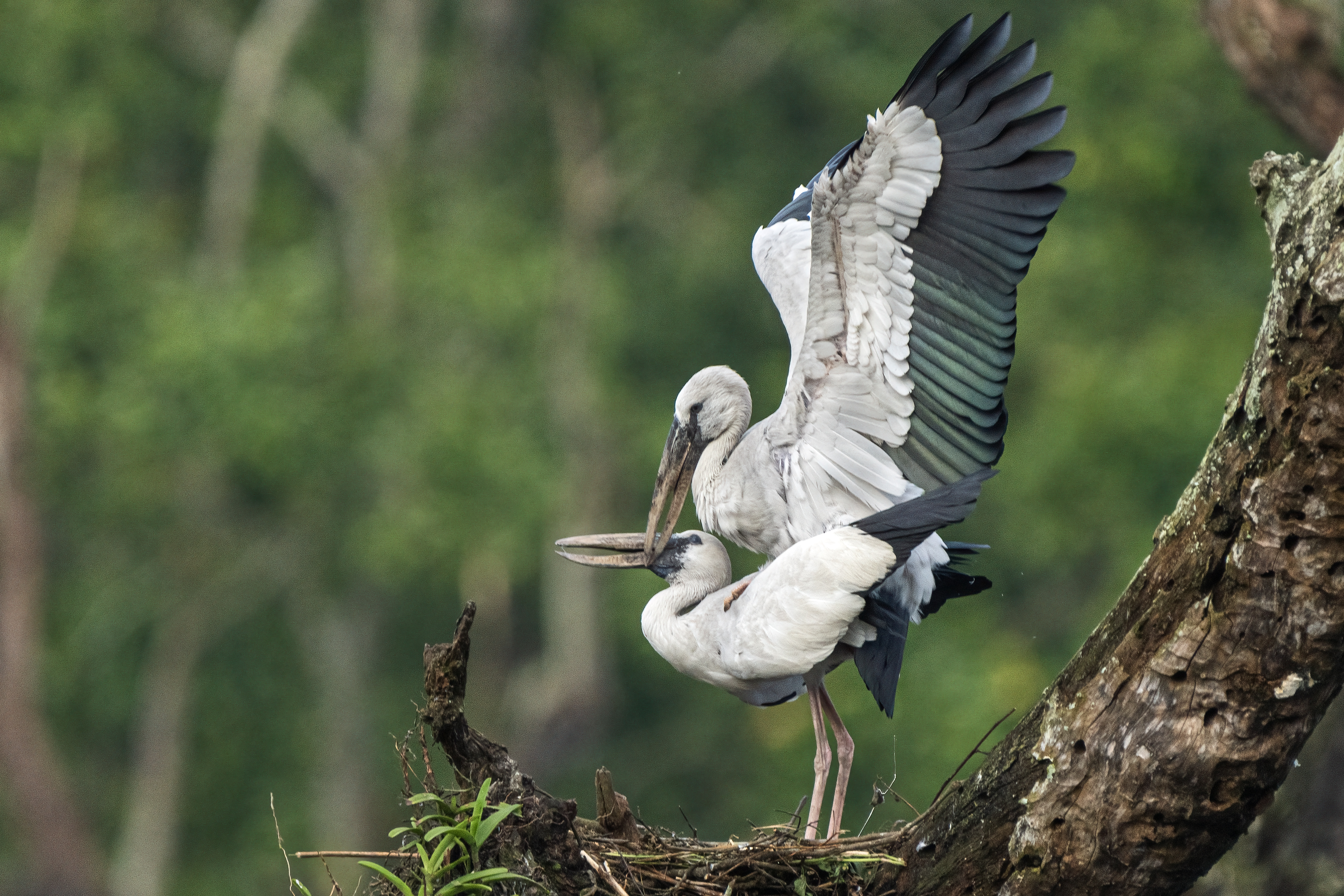
A pair copulating (Nepal)

Initiation of nests in lowland Nepal was highly synchronized, with colonies started during July and August. Breeding success at nests in these colonies was impacted by proximity of colonies to human habitation, and the progression of the breeding season. Colonies closer to human habitation had lower success, and colonies initiated later during the breeding season (when flooding of the rice fields had reduced to allow ripening of the crop) had lower success. Number of chicks that fledged from colonies located on trees in agricultural landscapes in lowland Nepal were similar to that observed in a protected, mangrove reserve in eastern India suggesting that agricultural areas are not always detrimental to large waterbirds such as Asian openbills.

Nesting openbills in Nepal took an average of 27 minutes to return to nests with food for nestlings and fledglings. The time taken to find food was most impacted by the location of wetlands around colonies, and the progression of the breeding season. Adults look the least time to return with food earlier in the season when the dominant rice crop was most flooded, and time increased as the rice ripened along with the drying out of the fields. Adult birds in Nepal provisioned chicks at nest with snails of the genus Filopaludina and Pila. Hatchlings received 87-120 g/day of food, while older nestlings received 272-386 g/day of food.

Like other storks, they are silent except for clattering produced by the striking of the male's bill against that of the female during copulation. They also produce low honking notes accompanied by up and down movements of the bill when greeting a partner arriving at the nest. Males may sometimes form polygynous associations, typically with two females which may lay their eggs in the same nest.

== Relationship with other organisms ==
Young birds at the nest are sometimes preyed on by imperial, steppe and greater spotted eagles. Chaunocephalus ferox, an intestinal parasite, is a trematode worm found in about 80% of the wild populations in Thailand while another species Echinoparyphium oscitansi has been described from Asian openbills in Thailand. Other helminth parasites such as Thapariella anastomusa, T. oesophagiala and T. udaipurensis have been described from the oesophagus of storks. The tick Argas (Persicargas) robertsi, commonly seen on domestic fowl, has been recovered from nesting Asian Openbills.

In colonial India, sportsmen shot the openbill for meat, calling it the "beef-steak bird" (although this name was also used for the woolly-necked stork).
