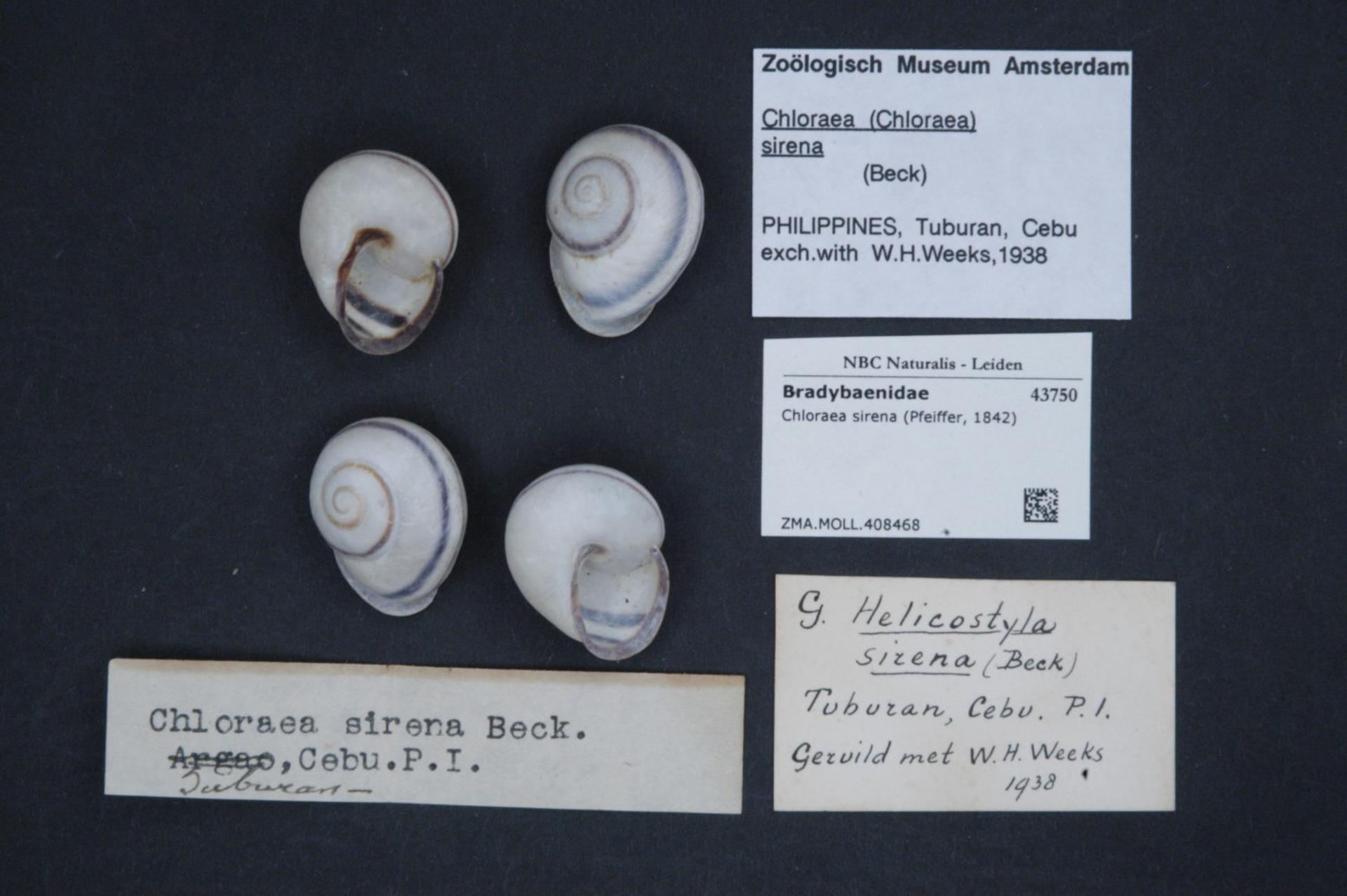
- Shell of Chloraea sirena (Pfeiffer, 1842)(specimen at Naturalis Biodiversity Center)

Scientific classification
- Kingdom: Animalia
- Phylum: Mollusca
- Class: Gastropoda
- Order: Stylommatophora
- Superfamily: Helicoidea
- Family: Camaenidae
- Subfamily: Helicostylinae
- Genus: Chloraea; Albers, 1850

Type species
- Helix sirena L. Pfeiffer, 1842

Synonyms
- Chloraea (Corasia) Albers, 1850 (invalid: junior homonym of Corasia Huebner, 1826 [Lepidoptera]); Cochlostyla (Chloraea) Albers, 1850 (unaccepted generic combination); Cochlostyla (Corasia) Albers, 1850 (invalid: junior homonym of Corasia Huebner, 1826 [Lepidoptera]); Corasia Albers, 1850 (Invalid: junior homonym of Corasia Huebner, 1826 [Lepidoptera]); Helicostyla (Coracia) Mörch, 1865 (misspelling of original name, Corasia, Albers, 1850); Helicostyla (Corasia) Albers, 1850; Helix (Chloraea) Albers, 1850 (original rank); Helix (Corasia) Albers, 1850 (Invalid: junior homonym of Corasia Huebner, 1826 [Lepidoptera])

= Chloraea (gastropod) =

Genus of gastropods

Chloraea is a genus of air-breathing land snails, terrestrial pulmonate gastropod mollusks in the subfamily Helicostylinae of the family Camaenidae.

== Species ==
Species in the genus Chloraea include:

- Chloraea aegrota (Reeve, 1851)
- Chloraea aeruginosa (L. Pfeiffer, 1855)
- Chloraea almae Möllendorff, 1890
- Chloraea amoena (L. Pfeiffer, 1845)
- Chloraea antonii C. Semper, 1880
- Chloraea benguetensis C. Semper, 1880
- Chloraea bifasciata (I. Lea, 1841)
- Chloraea caerulea (Möllendorff, 1888)
- Chloraea casta (L. Pfeiffer, 1849)
- Chloraea cristatella Quadras & Möllendorff, 1893
- Chloraea curvilabra (A. Adams & Reeve, 1850)
- Chloraea cymodoce (Crosse, 1869)
- Chloraea dealbata (Broderip, 1841)
- Chloraea difficilis (L. Pfeiffer, 1854)
- Chloraea dryope (Broderip, 1841)
- Chloraea elizabethae (O. Semper, 1866)
- Chloraea extensa (Müller, 1774)
- Chloraea eydouxi (Hidalgo, 1887)
- Chloraea fibula (Reeve, 1842)
- Chloraea filaris (L. Pfeiffer, 1845)
- Chloraea geotrochus Möllendorff, 1888
- Chloraea globosula (Möllendorff, 1894)
- Chloraea gmeliniana (L. Pfeiffer, 1845)
- Chloraea hanleyi (L. Pfeiffer, 1845)
- Chloraea hennigiana Möllendorff, 1893
- Chloraea intaminata (Gould, 1852)
- Chloraea intorta (G. B. Sowerby I, 1841)
- Chloraea irosinensis (Hidalgo, 1887)
- Chloraea lais (L. Pfeiffer, 1854)
- Chloraea limansauensis (C. Semper, 1877)
- Chloraea loheri (Möllendorff, 1894)
- Chloraea magtanensis (C. Semper, 1877)
- Chloraea malleata Quadras & Möllendorff, 1893
- Chloraea papyracea (Broderip, 1841)
- Chloraea paradoxa (L. Pfeiffer, 1845)
- Chloraea patricia (L. Pfeiffer, 1859)
- Chloraea pelewana (Mousson, 1869)
- Chloraea physalis (L. Pfeiffer, 1871)
- Chloraea psittacina (Deshayes, 1861)
- Chloraea puella (Broderip, 1841)
- Chloraea quadrasi Möllendorff, 1896
- Chloraea reginae (Broderip, 1841)
- Chloraea restricta (L. Pfeiffer, 1854)
- Chloraea samboanga (Hombron & Jacquinot, 1847)
- Chloraea sirena (L. Pfeiffer, 1842)
- Chloraea smaragdina (Grateloup, 1840)
- Chloraea sphaerion (G. B. Sowerby I, 1841)
- Chloraea subpuella (Pilsbry, 1891)
- Chloraea subtenuis (E. A. Smith, 1896)
- Chloraea tangoelandangensis (Rolle, 1910)
- Chloraea thersites (Broderip, 1841)
- Chloraea undina (L. Pfeiffer, 1856)
- Chloraea unifasciata Möllendorff, 1898
- Chloraea virgo (Broderip, 1841)
