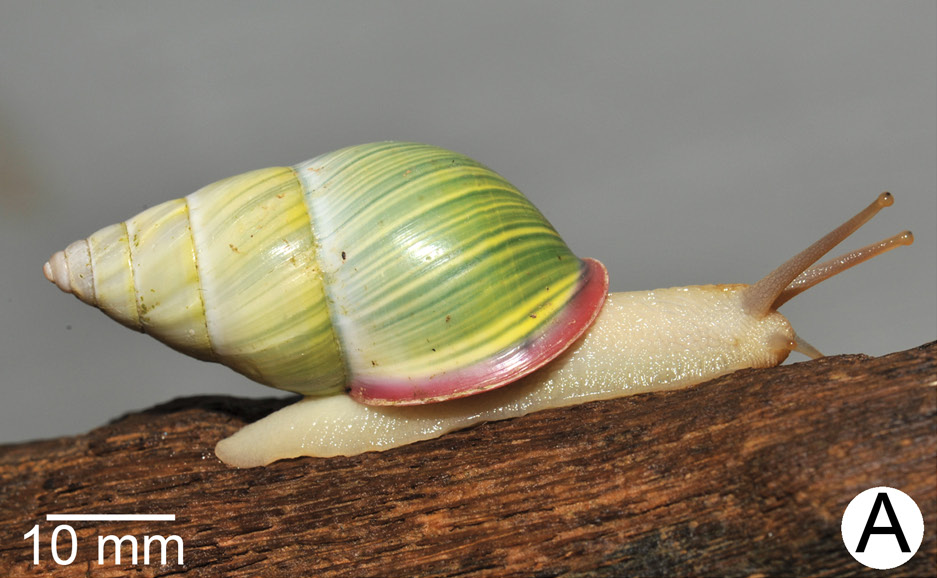
- Typical form of Amphidromus roseolabiatus
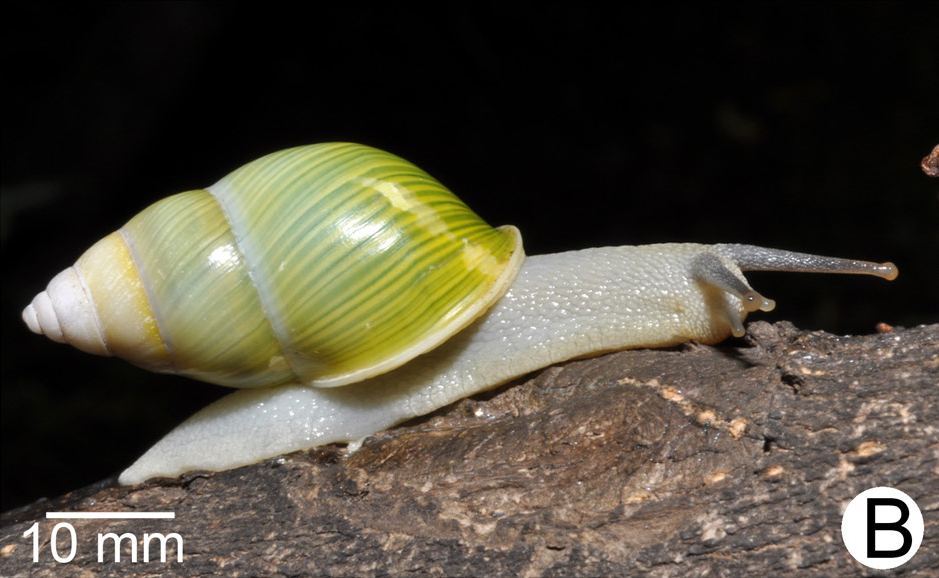
- Form of Amphidromus roseolabiatus with white lip

Scientific classification
- Kingdom: Animalia
- Phylum: Mollusca
- Class: Gastropoda
- Order: Stylommatophora
- Family: Camaenidae
- Genus: Amphidromus
- Species: A. roseolabiatus

Binomial name
- Amphidromus roseolabiatus Fulton, 1896

Synonyms
- Amphidromus (Amphidromus) roseolabiatus Fulton, 1896· accepted, alternate representation; Amphidromus arlingi Thach, 2017 (junior synonym); Amphidromus arlingi arlingi Thach, 2017 (junior synonym); Amphidromus arlingi daklakensis Thach, 2017 (junior synonym); Amphidromus johnabbasi Thach, 2017 (junior synonym); Amphidromus koonpoi Thach & F. Huber, 2018 (junior synonym); Amphidromus phuonglinhae Thach, 2017 (junior synonym); Amphidromus phuonglinhae vinhensis Thach & F. Huber, 2018 (junior synonym); Amphidromus poi Thach, 2018 (incorrect original spelling); Amphidromus severnsi anhi Thach, 2018 (junior synonym); Amphidromus severnsi improvidus Páll-Gergely, 2019 (junior synonym)

= Amphidromus roseolabiatus =

Species of gastropod

Amphidromus roseolabiatus is a species of terrestrial gastropod in the family Camaenidae.

== Distribution ==
Distribution of Amphidromus roseolabiatus includes central and northern Laos, Nan Province in Thailand and Phong Nha-Kẻ Bàng National Park in Vietnam. Found in Karimganj District, Bazaricherra, Assam, India.

== Description ==
The shell measures 24–42 mm (0.94–1.65 in) in height and 13–22 mm (0.51–0.87 in) in width.

(Original description) The sinistral shell is ovate-conic, moderately umbilicate, and relatively solid. It consists of 6.75 slightly convex whorls, with a barely discernible peripheral angulation. The upper whorls are white, transitioning to pale lemon on the lower whorls, which are marked by close-set, oblique light green lines. The shell exhibits spiral striations. The outer lip and the columella are pink and expanded, with the lip slightly reflected. The aperture's interior is white.

(Redescription) The shell is medium in size. It exhibits chirality dimorphism, and presents an elongate to ovate conical shape that is rather thin and glossy. The spire appears conical; the apex is acute and light brown, lacking a black spot on its tip. Comprising six to seven nearly smooth whorls, the shell displays a wide and depressed suture, and the body whorl is rounded. The periostracum is usually deciduous, sometimes showing yellowish-green radial streaks that appear more conspicuous on the body whorl and faded on earlier whorls. The body whorl features a thin, whitish subsutural band and may or may not have a reddish-brown spiral band on the periphery, though this band usually does not reach the apertural lip; a varix is absent. The parietal callus is thin and transparent. The aperture is ovate to elongate; the peristome is expanded and not reflected; the lip is usually purplish-pink. The columella is straight, thickened, and purplish-pink. The umbilicus is narrowly opened.

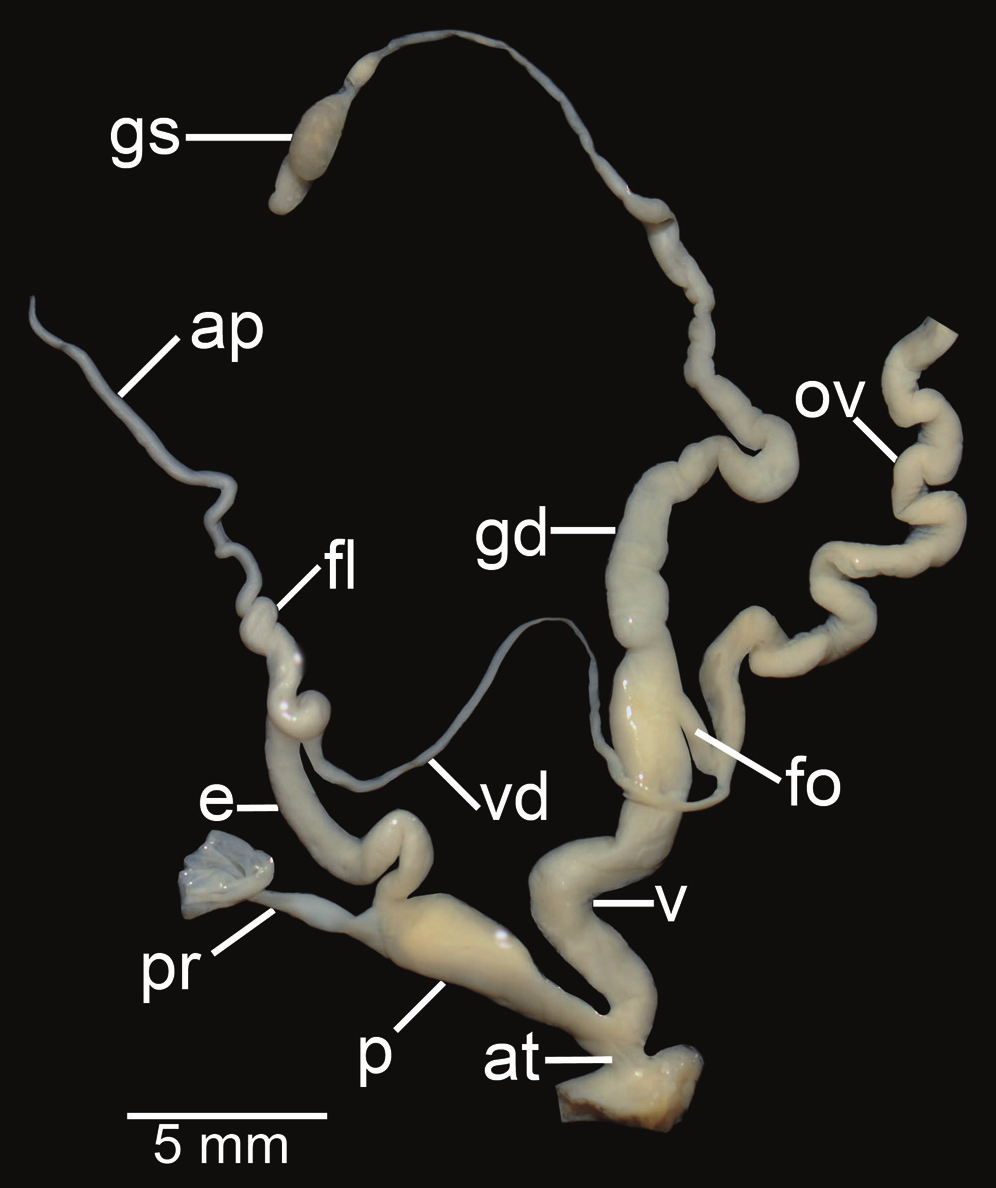
Reproductive system of Amphidromus roseolabiatus.

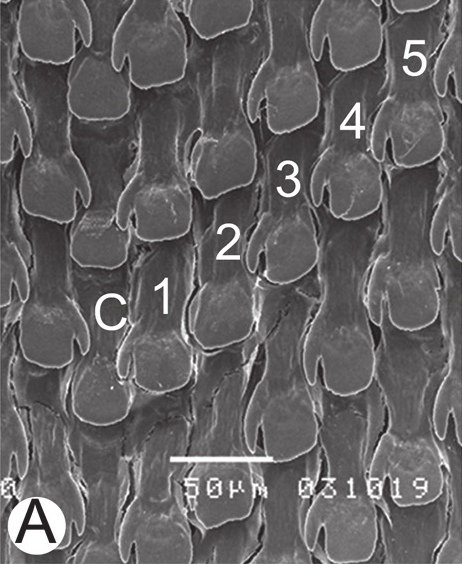
Central part of radula of Amphidromus roseolabiatus.

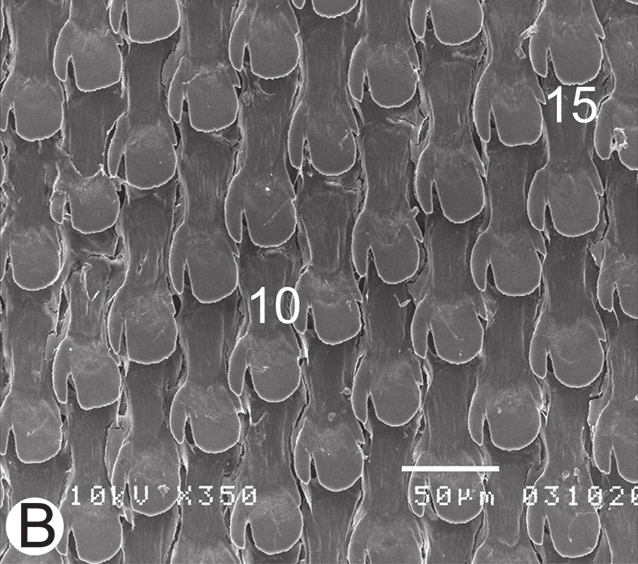
Lateral teeth of radula.

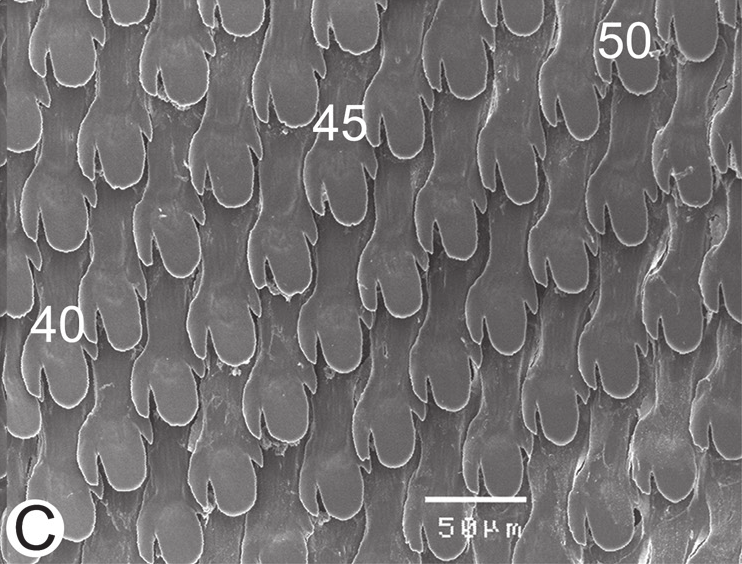
Outermost marginal teeth of radula.

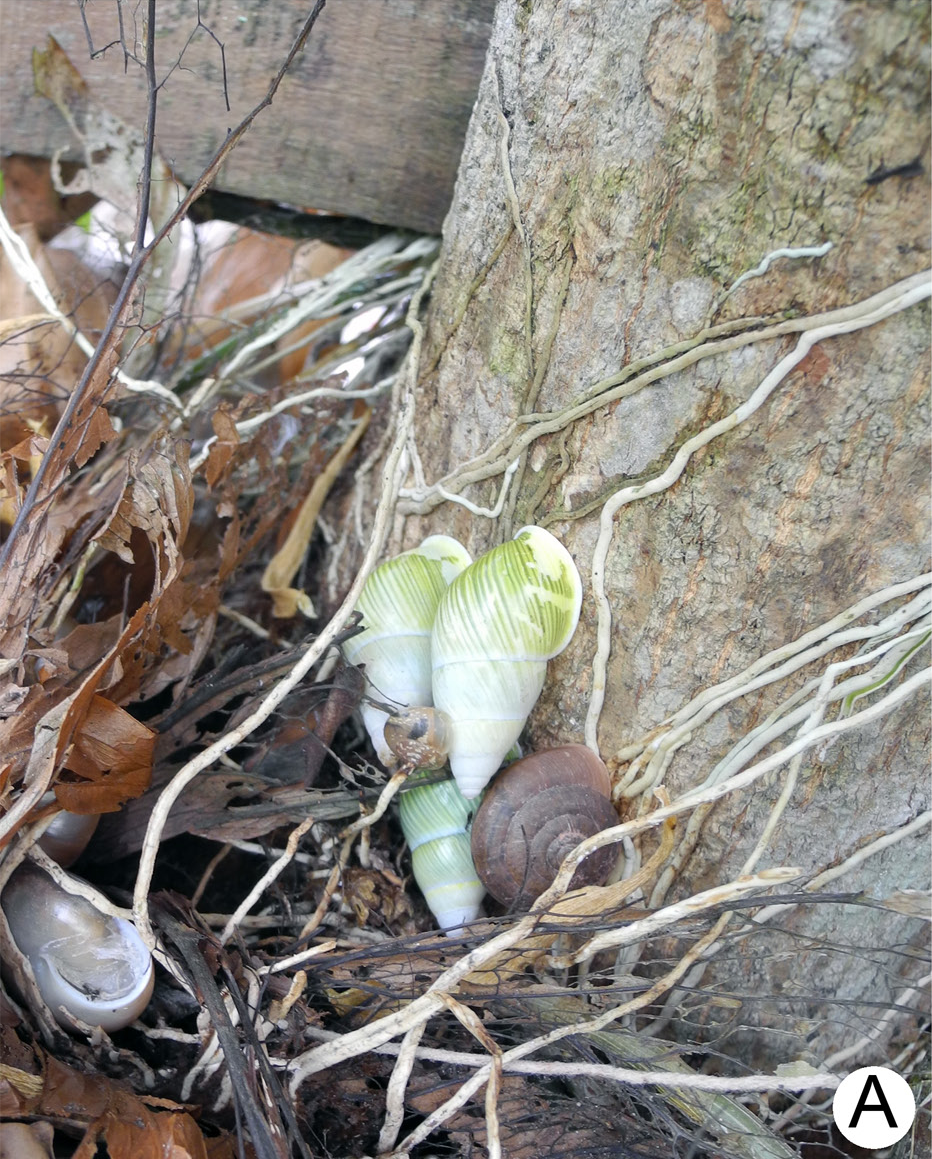
Aestivating Amphidromus roseolabiatus inside sterile fronds of stag horn ferns, Platycerium.
