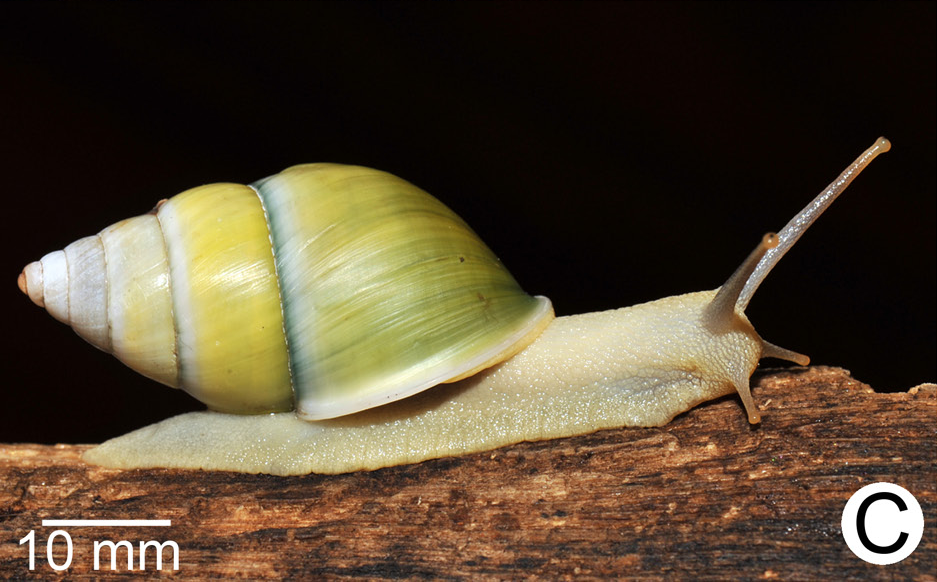
- Amphidromus givenchyi

Scientific classification
- Kingdom: Animalia
- Phylum: Mollusca
- Class: Gastropoda
- Order: Stylommatophora
- Family: Camaenidae
- Genus: Amphidromus
- Subgenus: Amphidromus
- Species: A. givenchyi

Binomial name
- Amphidromus givenchyi Geret, 1912

Synonyms
- Amphidromus (Amphidromus) givenchyi Geret, 1912· accepted, alternate representation; Amphidromus richgoldbergi Thach & F. Huber, 2017; Amphidromus severnsi Thach, 2017

= Amphidromus givenchyi =

Species of gastropod

Amphidromus givenchyi is a species of air-breathing land snail, a terrestrial pulmonate gastropod mollusk in the family Camaenidae.

== Description ==
The length of the shell attains 40 mm, its diameter 17 mm.

(Original description in Latin) The shell is solid, dextral, and somewhat glossy, featuring a very narrow perforation. Its spire presents an elevated-conoid shape. The shell comprises seven scarcely convex whorls. They are joined by a linear suture and ornamented with close-set growth lines that are visible only under a lens. The body whorl appears oval. The aperture exhibits an oval-semilunar form, with its margins joined by a very thin and scarcely conspicuous adnate callus. The columella is slightly curved, for the most part covering the umbilical slit. The outer lip appears a little dilated and shortly reflected.

The uppermost 3 1/2 whorls are whitish, with the first showing a minimal brown apical point. The following two whorls are also whitish but become yellowish towards the base and display a very narrow greenish-articulated line above, below the suture. The anterior part of the penultimate whorl and the body whorl are ornamented with strongly irregular, more or less confluent longitudinal green lines and are separated from a subsutural line by a transverse white zone, approximately 2 mm wide. The peristome is white, and the aperture is white inside.

== Distribution ==
Distribution of include Ubon Ratchathani Province and Kalasin Province in Thailand and Luang Prabang Province, Savannakhet Province and Salavan Province in Laos.
