= Filopaludina filosa =

Conservation status
- Least Concern (IUCN 3.1)

Scientific classification
- Kingdom: Animalia
- Phylum: Mollusca
- Class: Gastropoda
- Subclass: Caenogastropoda
- Order: Architaenioglossa
- Family: Viviparidae
- Genus: Filopaludina
- Species: F. filosa

Binomial name
- Filopaludina filosa (Reeve, 1863)

Synonyms
- Paludina filosa Reeve, 1863; Bellamaya filosa Haas, 1952

Species of gastropod

Filopaludina filosa is a species of large freshwater snail that possesses both gill and an operculum. It belongs to the family of Viviparidae and is classified as an aquatic gastropod mollusc.

== Distribution ==
This species is found in Cambodia, Laos, Myanmar, Thailand and Vietnam.

== Description ==
The shell width is 22 mm (0.87 in), and its height is 24 mm (0.94 in).
