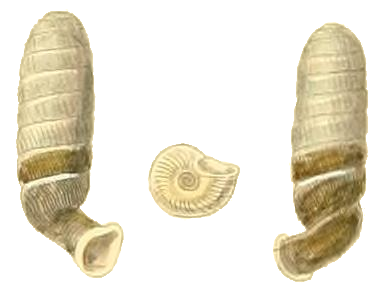
- Drawings showing apertural, umbilical and abapertural views of a shell of Diaphera cumingiana

Scientific classification
- Kingdom: Animalia
- Phylum: Mollusca
- Class: Gastropoda
- Order: Stylommatophora
- Family: Diapheridae
- Genus: Diaphera; Albers, 1850

Diversity
- more than 50 species

Synonyms
- Cylindrella (Diaphera) Albers, 1850 (original rank); Diaphora Martens, 1860 (unjustified emendation of the original name); Ennea (Diaphora) Martens, 1860 (unjustified emendation of the original name); Gulella (Diaphora) Martens, 1860 (unjustified emendation to the original name)

= Diaphera =

Genus of gastropods

Diaphera is a genus of air-breathing land snails, terrestrial pulmonate gastropod mollusks in the family Diapheridae.

Diaphera is the type genus of the family Diapheridae.

The genus Diaphera is generally poorly known.

== Distribution ==
The distribution of Diaphera includes South-East Asia: Myanmar, Thailand, Cambodia, the Philippines.

== Species ==
There more than 50 species in the genus Diaphera including:

- Diaphera anctostoma (Quadras & Möllendorff, 1895)
- Diaphera aptycha (Möllendorff, 1895)
- Diaphera brevicollis (Blanford, 1899)
- Diaphera canaliculata (Quadras & Möllendorff, 1896)
- Diaphera cardiostoma (Quadras & Möllendorff, 1894)
- Diaphera connectens Bruggen, 1974
- Diaphera cristatella (Möllendorff, 1896)
- Diaphera cumingiana Pfeiffer, 1845 - type species of the genus Diaphera
- Diaphera cuspidata (Möllendorff, 1895)
- Diaphera cylindrelloidea (Stoliczka, 1871)
- Diaphera cylindrica (Quadras & Möllendorff, 1895)
- Diaphera densecostulata (Möllendorff, 1901)
- Diaphera devians (Möllendorff, 1890)
- Diaphera dicraspedia (Möllendorff, 1898)
- Diaphera dilophia (Quadras & Möllendorff, 1895)
- Diaphera eulophia (Quadras & Möllendorff, 1895)
- Diaphera euryomphala (Möllendorff, 1895)
- Diaphera eutrachela (Möllendorff, 1890)
- Diaphera helenae Vermeulen, 1990
- Diaphera hidalgoi (Möllendorff, 1888)
- Diaphera homalogyra (Quadras & Möllendorff, 1895)
- Diaphera kobelti (Möllendorff, 1898)
- Diaphera kochiana (Möllendorff, 1888)
- Diaphera lini Z.-Y. Chen & Páll-Gergely, 2020
- Diaphera locardi (Hidalgo, 1890)
- Diaphera macrostoma (Quadras & Möllendorff, 1894)
- Diaphera moellendorffi (Hidalgo, 1889)
- Diaphera morleti (Hidalgo, 1889)
- Diaphera nitidula (Quadras & Möllendorff, 1894)
- Diaphera obliquapex Bruggen, 1974
- Diaphera otostoma (Quadras & Möllendorff, 1894)
- Diaphera palawanica Bruggen, 1974
- Diaphera pleistogyra (Quadras & Möllendorff, 1895)
- Diaphera polita Páll-Gergely, 2020
- Diaphera porrecta (Martens, 1884)
- Diaphera prima Panha, 2010
- Diaphera quadrasi (Möllendorff, 1887)
- Diaphera samarica (Möllendorff, 1896)
- Diaphera saurini Benthem Jutting, 1962
- Diaphera seatoni (Beddome, 1891)
- Diaphera sericina (Möllendorff, 1887)
- Diaphera solenidium (Möllendorff, 1896)
- Diaphera strangulata (Möllendorff, 1894)
- Diaphera strophostoma (Quadras & Möllendorff, 1896)
- Diaphera telescopium (Möllendorff, 1896)
- Diaphera torta (Quadras & Möllendorff, 1894)
- Diaphera truncatella (Möllendorff, 1896)
- Diaphera tuba (Möllendorff, 1887)
- Diaphera turbanophora Páll-Gergely & Grego, 2020
- Diaphera unicristata (Möllendorff, 1894)
- Diaphera wilfordii Dance, 1970

Synonym

- Diaphera (Huttonella) kohllarseni Haas, 1936: synonym of Gulella kohllarseni (Haas, 1936) (original combination)
