= Filopaludina maekoki =

Conservation status
- Least Concern (IUCN 3.1)

Scientific classification
- Kingdom: Animalia
- Phylum: Mollusca
- Class: Gastropoda
- Subclass: Caenogastropoda
- Order: Architaenioglossa
- Family: Viviparidae
- Genus: Filopaludina
- Species: F. maekoki

Binomial name
- Filopaludina maekoki (Brandt, 1968)

Synonyms
- Filopaludina (Siamopaludina) maekoki (Brandt, 1968) · accepted, alternate representation; Siamopaludina maekoki Brandt, 1968

Species of gastropod

Filopaludina maekoki is a species of large freshwater snail with a gill and an operculum, an aquatic gastropod mollusc in the family Viviparidae.

== Distribution ==
This species is found in the northern Thailand.
