= Filopaludina miveruensis =

Conservation status
- Data Deficient (IUCN 3.1)

Scientific classification
- Kingdom: Animalia
- Phylum: Mollusca
- Class: Gastropoda
- Subclass: Caenogastropoda
- Order: Architaenioglossa
- Family: Viviparidae
- Genus: Filopaludina
- Species: F. miveruensis

Binomial name
- Filopaludina miveruensis Smith

Species of gastropod

Filopaludina miveruensis is a species of large freshwater snail with a gill and an operculum, an aquatic gastropod mollusc in the family Viviparidae.

== Distribution ==
This species has been reported from Vietnam, but there are doubts about the validity of this species. It may in fact be the African species Bellamya mweruensis.
