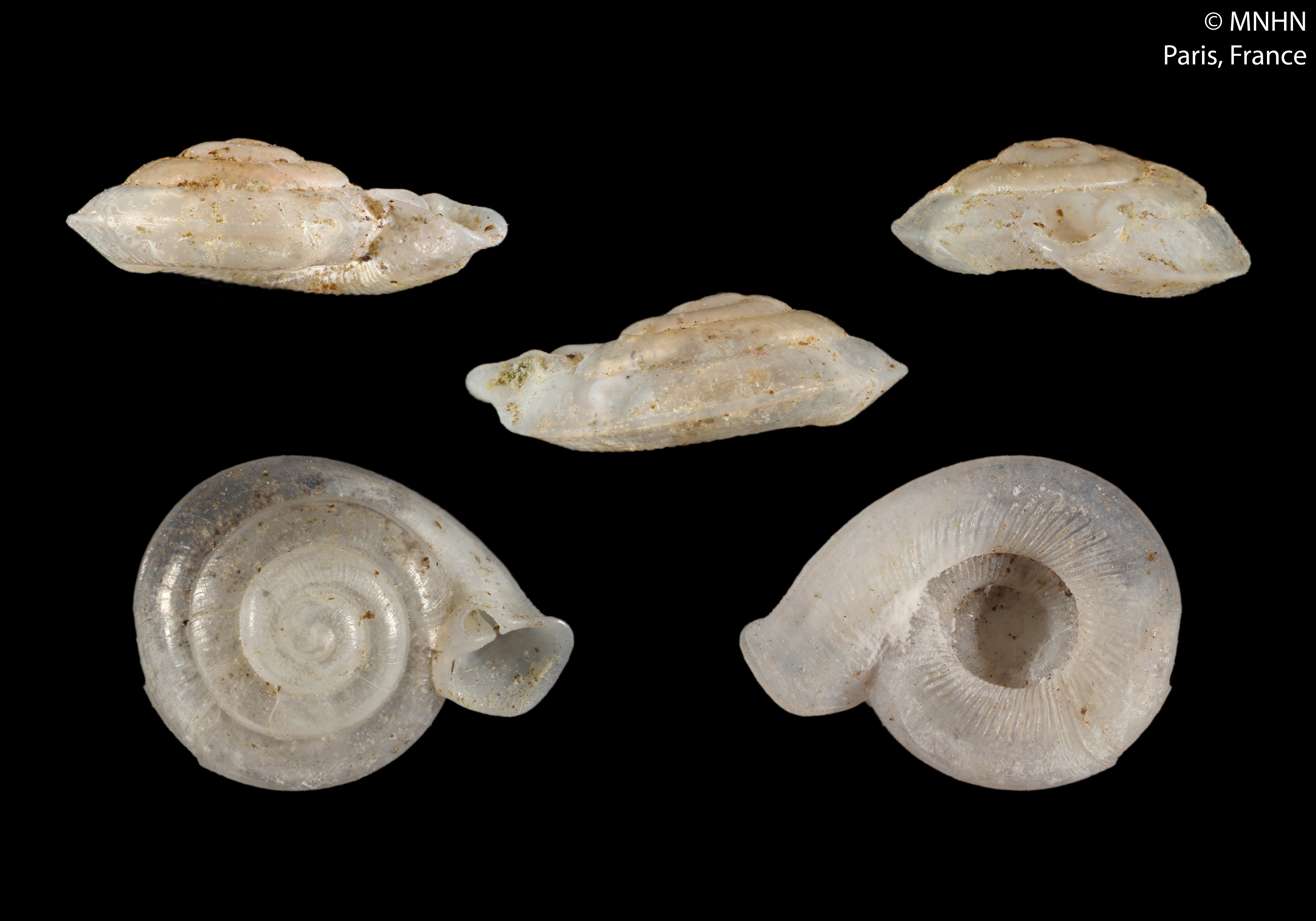
- Shell of Tonkinia mirabilis (syntype at MNHN, Paris)

Scientific classification
- Domain: Eukaryota
- Kingdom: Animalia
- Phylum: Mollusca
- Class: Gastropoda
- Order: Stylommatophora
- Superfamily: Streptaxoidea
- Family: Diapheridae
- Genus: Tonkinia; Mabille, 1887

Type species
- Tonkinia mirabilis Mabille, 1887

= Tonkinia =

Genus of gastropods

Tonkinia is a genus of air-breathing land snails, terrestrial pulmonate gastropod mollusks in the family Diapheridae.

== Distribution ==
The distribution of the genus Tonkinia includes:

- north Vietnam

== Species ==
Species within the genus Tonkinia include:

- Tonkinia mirabilis Mabille, 1887
- Tonkinia struposa (Mabille, 1887)
