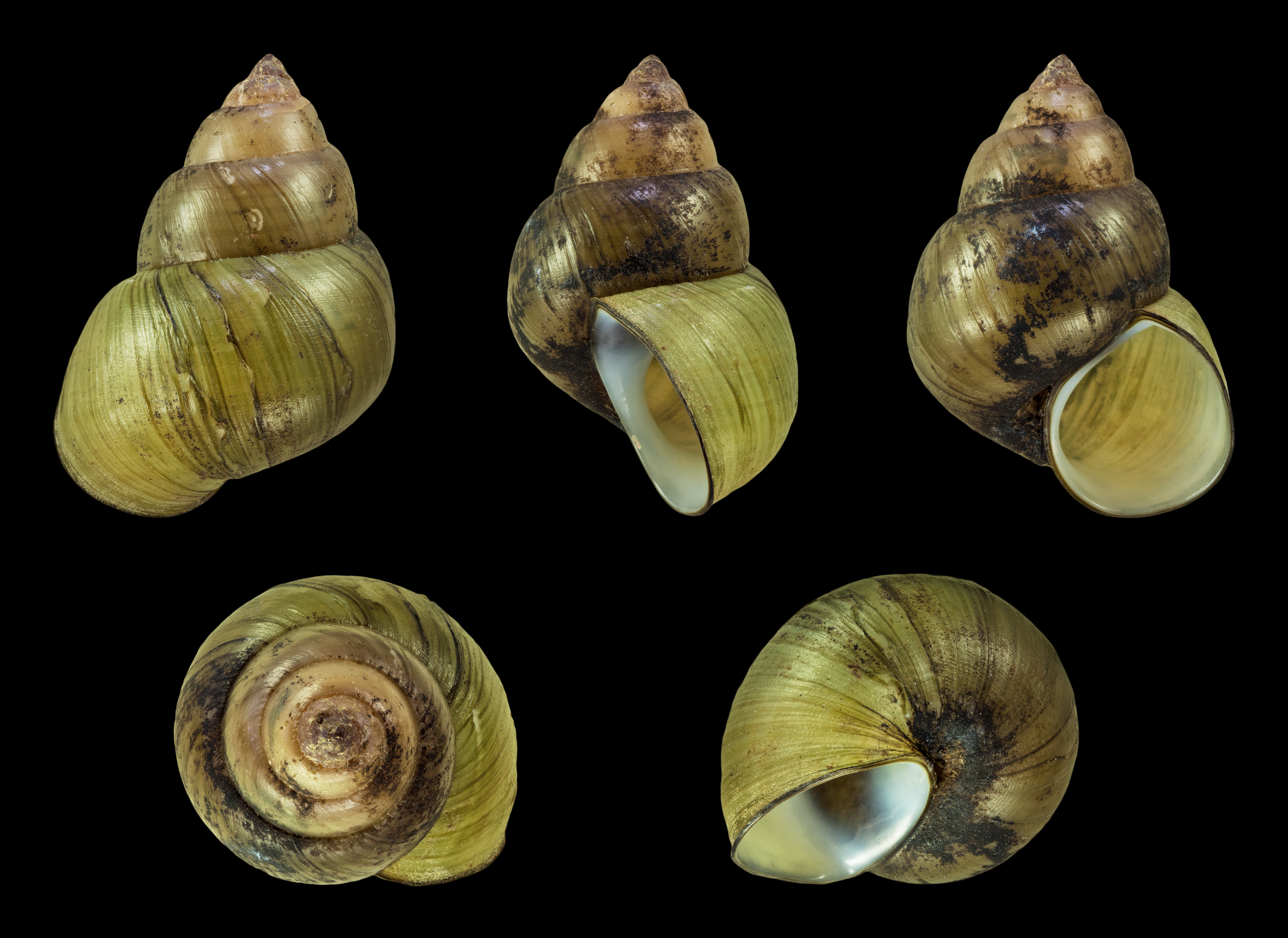

Conservation status
- Least Concern (IUCN 3.1)

Scientific classification
- Kingdom: Animalia
- Phylum: Mollusca
- Class: Gastropoda
- Subclass: Caenogastropoda
- Order: Architaenioglossa
- Family: Viviparidae
- Genus: Filopaludina
- Species: F. javanica

Binomial name
- Filopaludina javanica (von dem Busch, 1844)

Synonyms
- Vivipara javanica von dem Busch, 1844; Bellamya javanica (von dem Busch, 1844); Vivipara costata Quoy & Gimard, 1830-1835; Vivipara gratiosa Martens, 1897; Idiopoma javanica (von dem Busch, 1844); Siamopaludina javanica (von dem Busch, 1844)

= Filopaludina javanica =

Species of gastropod

Filopaludina javanica or Idiopoma javanica is a species of large freshwater snail with a gill and an operculum, an aquatic gastropod mollusc in the family Viviparidae.

== Subspecies ==
There are recognized two subspecies:

- Filopaludina javanica javanica (von dem Busch, 1844)
- Filopaludina javanica continentalis or Idiopoma javanica continentalis Brandt, 1974

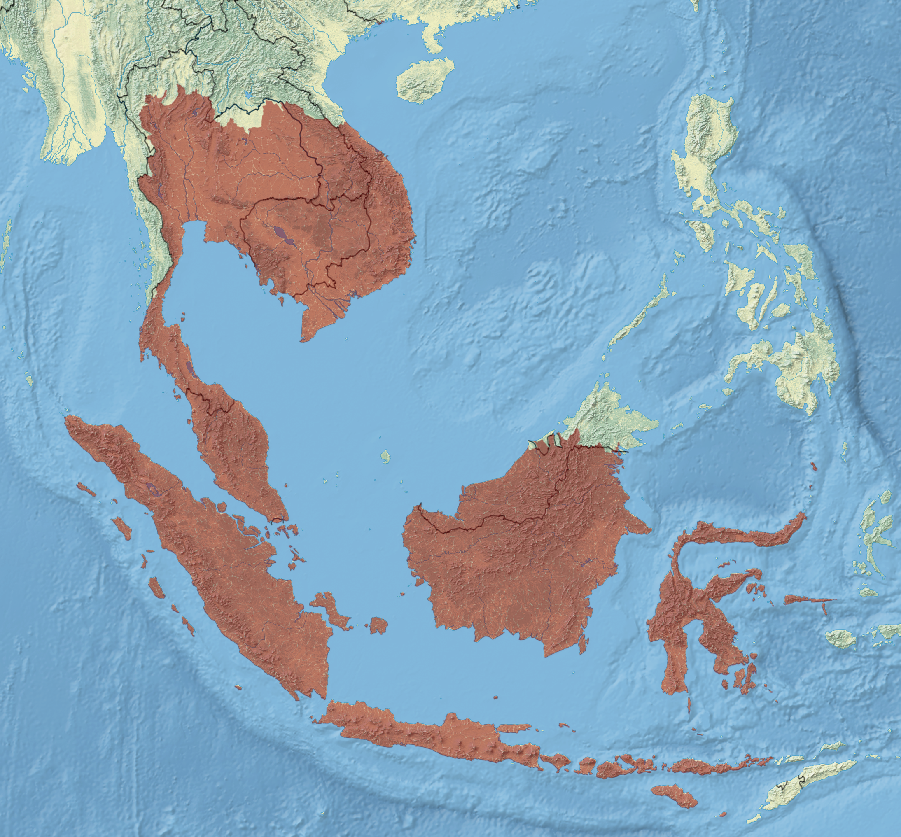
Distribution map of Filopaludina javanica

== Distribution ==
This species is found in Thailand, Cambodia, Vietnam, Laos, Peninsular Malaysia and Indonesia (Sumatra and Java).

== Description ==
The height of the shell is 30–35 mm.

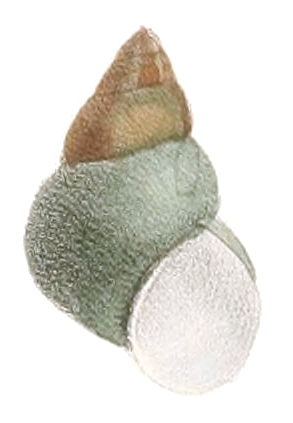
Drawing of an apertural view of a shell of Filopaludina javanica from its type description.

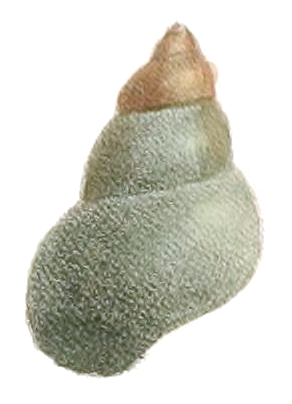
An abapertural view.

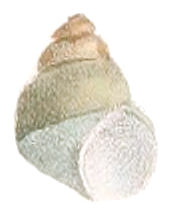
A juvenile shell.

== Ecology ==
This species inhabits ponds, rice fields and irrigation channels.

Parasites of Filopaludina javanica include Echinostoma echinatum (see also Beaver et al. 1984).

== Human use ==
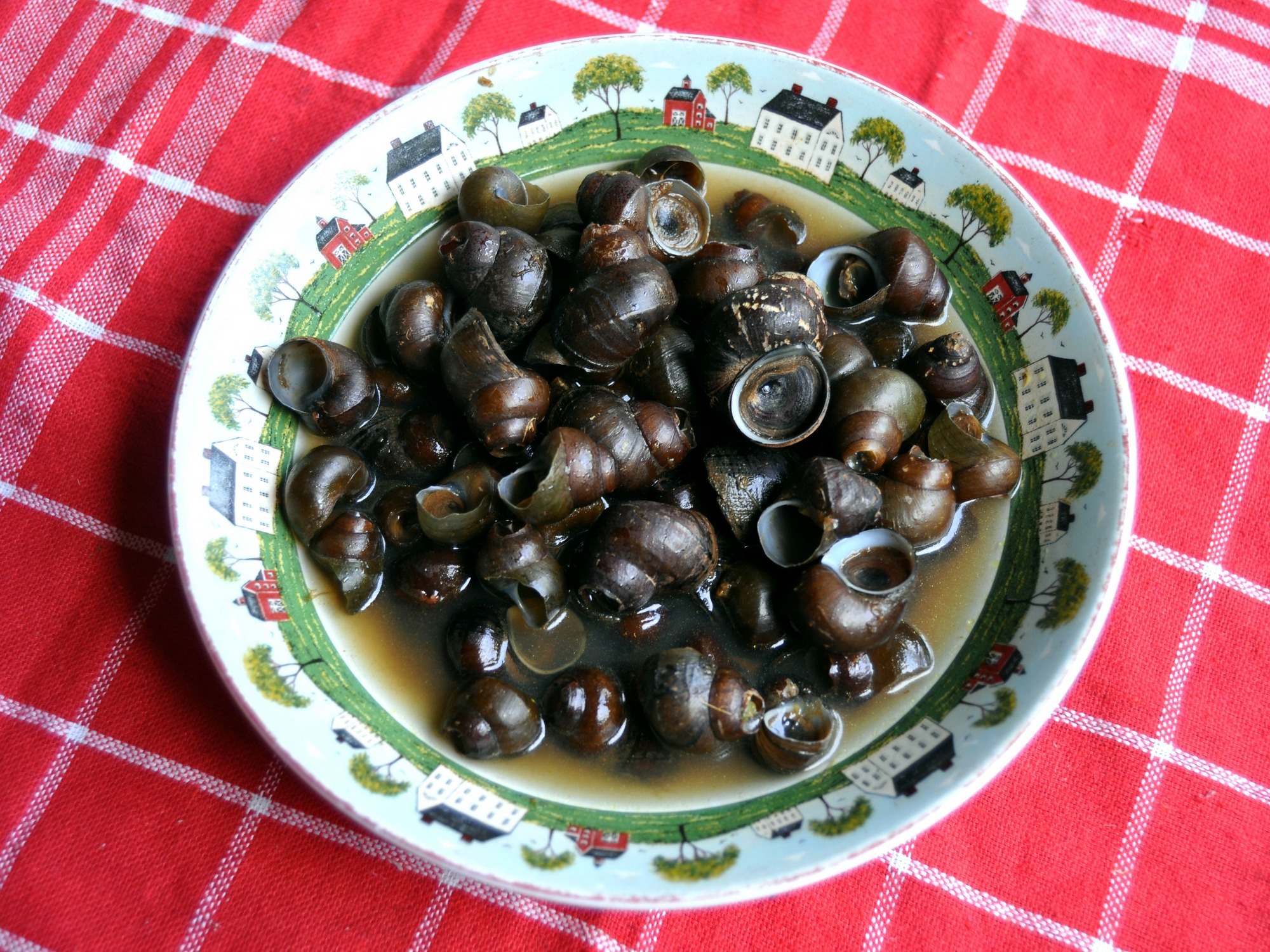
A dish of boiled Filopaludina javanica from West Java.

Filopaludina javanica is prepared by boiling and it used often as part of the cuisine of Java.
