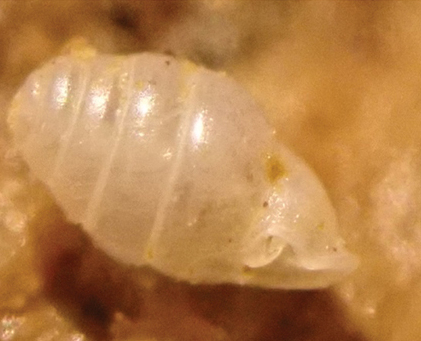
- Laoennea renouardi

Scientific classification
- Kingdom: Animalia
- Phylum: Mollusca
- Class: Gastropoda
- Order: Stylommatophora
- Family: Diapheridae
- Genus: Laoennea; Páll-Gergely, 2020

= Laoennea =

Genus of gastropods

Laoennea is a genus of air-breathing land snails, terrestrial pulmonate gastropod mollusks in the family Diapheridae.

== Species ==
There are two species in the genus Laoennea:

- Laoennea carychioides Páll-Gergely, A. Reischütz & Maassen, 2020
- Laoennea renouardi Jochum & Wackenheim, 2020
