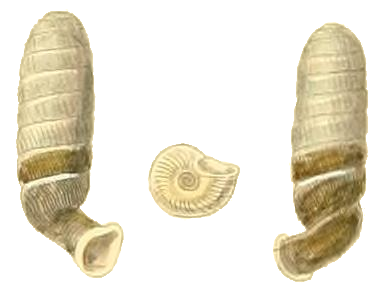
- Drawing of apertural, umbilical and abapertural view of the shell of Diaphera cumingiana.

Scientific classification
- Domain: Eukaryota
- Kingdom: Animalia
- Phylum: Mollusca
- Class: Gastropoda
- Order: Stylommatophora
- Family: Diapheridae
- Genus: Diaphera
- Species: D. cumingiana

Binomial name
- Diaphera cumingiana (Pfeiffer, 1845)

Synonyms
- Cylindrella cumingiana Pfeiffer, 1845

= Diaphera cumingiana =

Species of gastropod

Diaphera cumingiana is a species of air-breathing land snail, a terrestrial pulmonate gastropod mollusk in the family Diapheridae.

Diaphera cumingiana is the type species of the genus Diaphera.

The specific name cumingiana is in honor of the English naturalist Hugh Cuming.

== Distribution ==
The type locality of Diaphera cumingiana is the Philippines.
