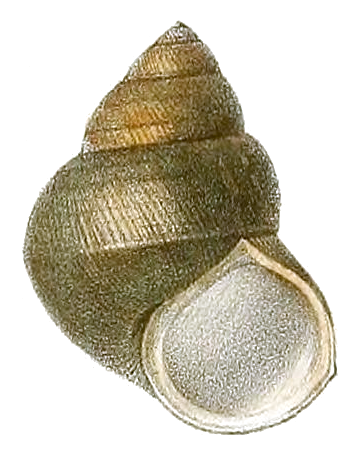
- Drawing of an apertural view of a shell of Filopaludina martensi

Scientific classification
- Kingdom: Animalia
- Phylum: Mollusca
- Class: Gastropoda
- Subclass: Caenogastropoda
- Order: Architaenioglossa
- Family: Viviparidae
- Subfamily: Bellamyinae
- Genus: Filopaludina; Habe, 1964

Type species
- Paludina bengalensis Lamarck, 1818

Synonyms
- Filopaludina (Filopaludina) Habe, 1964 · accepted, alternate representation; Filopaludina (Siamopaludina) Brandt, 1968 · accepted, alternate representation; Siamopaludina Brandt, 1968

= Filopaludina =

Genus of gastropods

Filopaludina is a genus of freshwater snails with a gill and an operculum, aquatic gastropod molluscs in the family Viviparidae.

== Distribution ==
The indigenous distribution of Filopaludina includes Southeast Asia.

== Species ==
Species within the genus Filopaludina are within two subgenera and they include:

subgenus Siamopaludina Brandt, 1968

- Filopaludina javanica (von dem Busch, 1844)
- Filopaludina maekoki (Brandt, 1968)
- Filopaludina martensi (Frauenfeld, 1865)
  - Filopaludina martensi cambodiensis Brandt, 1974
  - Filopaludina martensi martensi (Frauenfeld, 1865)
  - Filopaludina martensi munensis Brandt, 1974

subgenus Filopaludina Habe, 1964

- Filopaludina filosa (Reeve, 1863)
- Filopaludina miveruensis Smith
- Filopaludina sumatrensis (Dunker, 1852)
  - Filopaludina sumatrensis peninsularis Brandt, 1974

subgenus ?

- Filopaludina bengalensis (Lamarck, 1818)
- Filopaludina munensis

Synonyms:

- Filopaludina doliaris (Gould, 1844) is a synonym of Idiopoma doliaris (Gould, 1844)
- Filopaludina mandahlbarthi is a synonym of Sinotaia mandahlbarthi Brandt, 1968
- Filopaludina quadrata (Benson, 1842) is a synonym of Sinotaia quadrata (Benson, 1842)
- Filopaludina simonis Bavay, 1898 is a synonym of Idiopoma simonis Bavay, 1898

== Ecology ==
Filopaludina sp. from Vietnam serves as a second intermediate host for the parasitic fluke Echinostoma revolutum.
