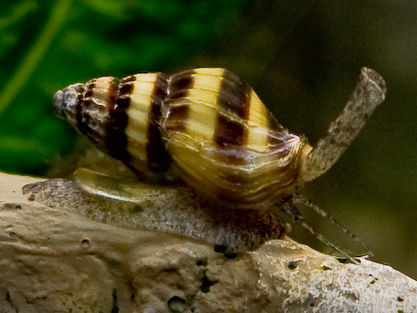

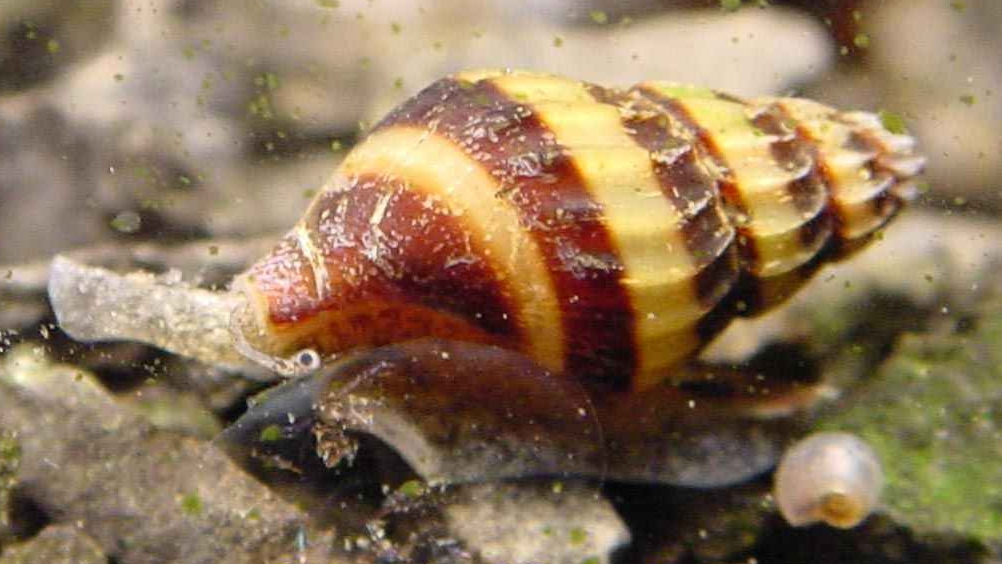

Scientific classification
- Kingdom: Animalia
- Phylum: Mollusca
- Class: Gastropoda
- Subclass: Caenogastropoda
- Order: Neogastropoda
- Family: Nassariidae
- Genus: Anentome
- Species: A. helena

Binomial name
- Anentome helena (von dem Busch, 1847)
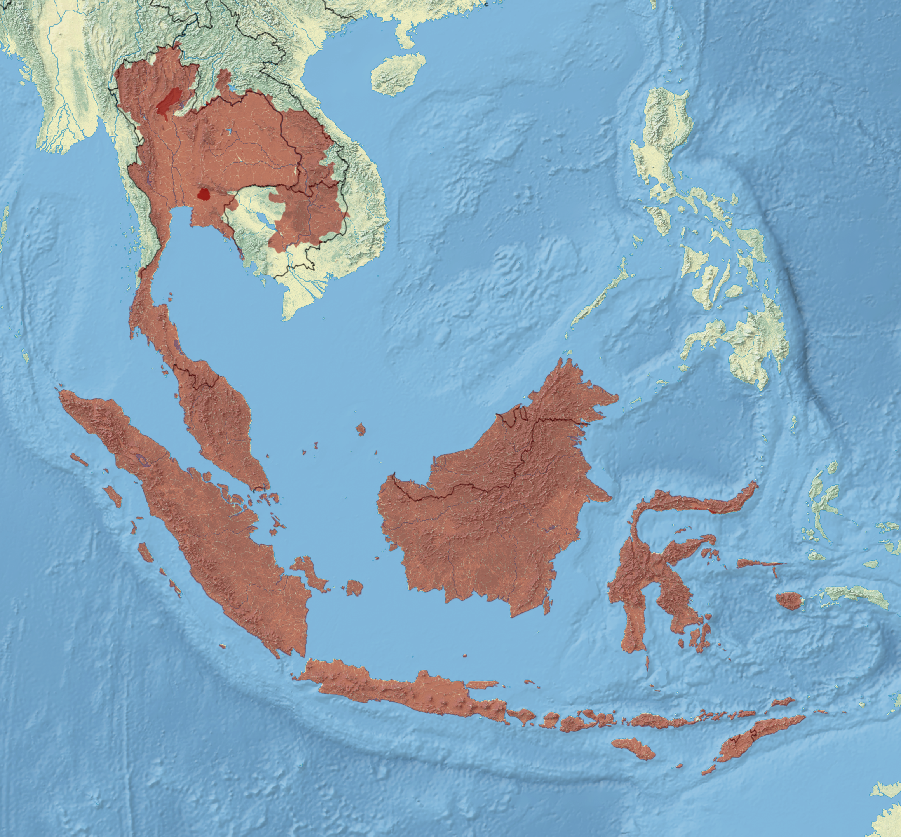
- Distribution map of Anentome helena

Synonyms
- List: Canidia bocourti Brot, 1876; Canidia fusiformis Deshayes, 1876; Canidia harmandiana Rochebrune, 1881; Canidia helena (von dem Busch, 1847); Canidia helena var. rotundicosta Schepman, 1891; Canidia helena var. rotundicosta f. angustior Schepman, 1891; Canidia stomatodonta Rochebrune, 1882; Canidia tenuicostata Brot, 1876; Clea (Anentome) helena (von dem Busch, 1847); Clea helena (von dem Busch, 1847); Clea theminckiana (Petit de la Saussaye, 1853); Hemisinus baudonianus Mabille & Le Mesle, 1866; Hemisinus helena (Philippi, 1847); Hemisinus theminckianus (Petit de la Saussaye, 1853); Melania helena von dem Busch, 1847; Melania theminckiana Petit de la Saussaye, 1853

= Anentome helena =

Species of Gastropoda

Anentome helena, common name assassin snail or bumblebee snail, is a species of freshwater snail with an operculum, an aquatic gastropod in the family Nassariidae, most of which are marine.

== Distribution ==
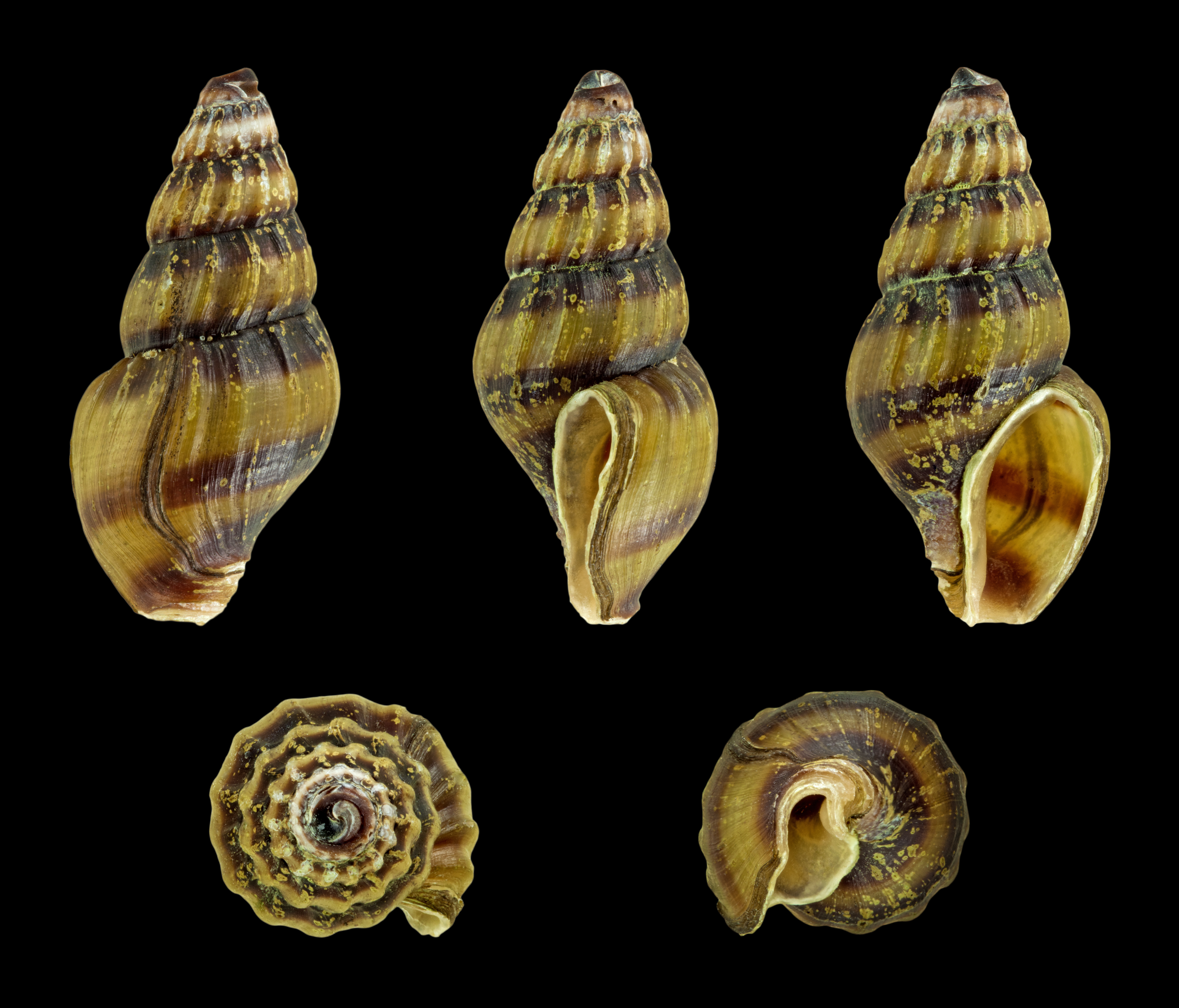

The assassin snail is found throughout southeast Asia, especially in Malaysia, Thailand, and in Lake Toba on the Indonesian island Sumatra.

== Description ==
The assassin snail typically grows to 0.7–1.25 in (18–32 mm) in size, though this is dependent on food sources; they are usually smaller when kept in an aquarium. The shell, which is conical in shape, often consists of dark brown and yellowish tan bands, leading to some people to refer to it as the bumble bee snail, a name also applied to the marine snail Engina mendicaria. Some specimens have been identified with completely brown shells, lacking banding.

== Ecology ==
=== Habitat ===
The assassin snail spends much of its time buried in substrate. They are least active during mid-day; however, they can sense food and will become active if fed.

=== Feeding habits ===
Like all snails in the clade Neogastropoda, the assassin snail is carnivorous. It feeds on worms and gastropods, garnering it the common moniker of "assassin snail" for its habit of eating other snails. The snail will often feed on larger snails, often burying itself in order to ambush prey.

Anentome helena may be a serious threat to native freshwater gastropods in countries when introduced.

=== Life cycle ===
In Anentome helena, the sexes are separated, meaning there are male and female individuals which are not hermaphroditic. Currently it is not known how to identify which is male and which is female. Both males and females seem to be the same size and shape. When a male and female mate, they lock together for many hours. The female lays several clear egg capsules which are square in shape and approximately 1.0 to 1.5 mm (0.04 to 0.06 in) in width and height. Each egg capsule contains a single small yellow egg. The egg capsules are generally laid on solid surfaces such as plastic and often on the base of plants. Fertile eggs usually hatch within a few weeks.

=== Parasites ===
Like many snail species, Anentome helena can serve as an intermediate host to trematode parasites. It has been confirmed as an intermediate host to Echinostoma revolutum in the Chiang Mai province in Thailand.

== Human use ==
A. helena is a part of the ornamental pet trade for freshwater aquaria, where it is used to control populations of unwanted small snail species such as the Malaysian trumpet snail.
