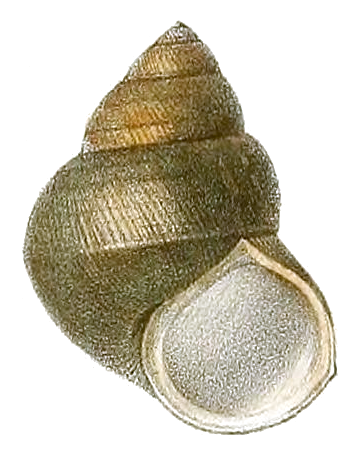
- Drawing of an apertural view of a shell of Filopaludina martensi
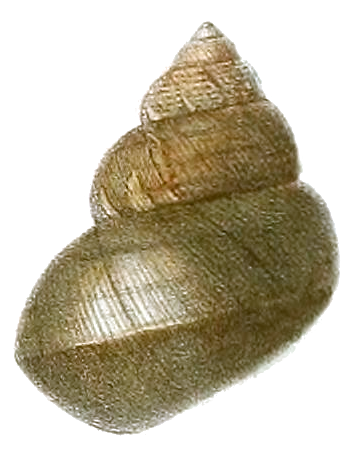
- Abapertural view of a shell

Conservation status
- Least Concern (IUCN 3.1)

Scientific classification
- Kingdom: Animalia
- Phylum: Mollusca
- Class: Gastropoda
- Subclass: Caenogastropoda
- Order: Architaenioglossa
- Family: Viviparidae
- Genus: Filopaludina
- Species: F. martensi

Binomial name
- Filopaludina martensi (Frauenfeld, 1864)

Synonyms
- Paludina cingulata Martens, 1860; Vivipara martensi Frauenfeld, 1864; Sinotai ingallsiana Ito, 1962; Bellamya ingallsiana Solem, 1966

= Filopaludina martensi =

Species of gastropod

Filopaludina martensi is a species of large freshwater snail with a gill and an operculum, an aquatic gastropod mollusc in the family Viviparidae.

== Description ==
The shape of the shell is ovate-conic. The apex is acute and violet-black in colour. The umbilicus of the shell is very narrow. There are fine spiral lines on the shell. The color of the shell is green or dark brown-blackish. The shell has 6–7 convex whorls. Whorls are with upper spiral lines, some are obsolescently sculptured. The last whorl is swollen.

The aperture is oblique, ovately rounded. The aperture is cerulean-white in colour. The upper part of the aperture is not acute. The peristome is straight, thick, blunt, often outwardly blackish.

The width of the shell is up to 31 millimetres (1.2 in). The height of the shell is up to 55 millimetres (2.2 in). The length of the aperture is up to 21 millimetres (0.83 in).

The operculum has the color of horn with golden shining and it is widely ovate. There are concentric lines on the operculum.

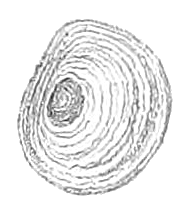
Outer side of an operculum

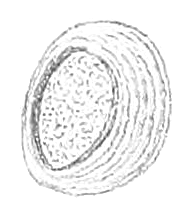
Inner side of an operculum

== Taxonomy ==
This species was firstly described by Eduard von Martens under the name Paludina cingulata in 1860 based on specimen collected by Henri Mouhot. Georg Ritter von Frauenfeld created a new replacement name Vivipara martensi for this species in 1864, because the name Vivipara cingulata was already used for a fossil species by Philippe Matheron before.

=== Subspecies ===
Three subspecies are recognized, but this species and its subspecies require revision.

- Filopaludina martensi cambodiensis Brandt, 1974
- Filopaludina martensi martensi (Frauenfeld, 1864)
- Filopaludina martensi munensis Brandt, 1974

== Distribution ==
This species is found in Cambodia, Indonesia, Laos, Malaysia, Philippines, Thailand and Vietnam. The type locality is "Siam" (a detailed type locality was not given).

== Ecology ==
Filopaludina martensi lives in canals and ponds. It feeds (as do all other Viviparidae) as a filter feeder. There are in development 0–14 juveniles in a brood-pouch of a female. Female gave birth to juveniles mainly at night. Parasites of Filopaludina martensi martensi include:

- Paragonimus siamensis as the first intermediate host.
- at least three species of Echinostomatidae

Parasites of Filopaludina martensi include trematode Multicotyle purvisi.

== Human use ==
Filopaludina martensi is used as part of the cuisine of Thailand.
