= Johann Christian Albers =

German physician and malacologist

- Born: 13 March 1795; Bremen, Holy Roman Empire
- Died: September 1857 (aged 62); Stuttgart
- Occupations: Medical doctor and malacologist

Johann Christian Albers (also Johann Christoph Albers; 13 March 1795, Bremen – September 1857, Stuttgart) was a German medical doctor and malacologist.

During his career, he served as Medicinalrath and Regierungsrath in Berlin. As a zoologist, he was the taxonomic authority of the land snail family Orthalicidae and of numerous land snail genera, including: Napaeus, Diaphera, Amphidromus, Scutalus, Drymaeus and Opeas.

In the field of medicine, Albers published an edition from Karl August Wilhelm Berends' "Vorlesungen über die praktische Arzneiwissenschaft" ("Lectures on practical medical science") with the title "Handbuch der Nervenkrankheiten" (1840).

== Principal works ==
- Die Heliceen nach natürlicher Verwandtschaft systematisch geordnet, 1850 – The helicids by natural affinity, arranged systematically.
- Malacographia Maderensis sive enumeratio molluscorum..., 1854 – Malacography of Madeira, or an enumeration of the mollusks of the islands of Madeira, both living and fossil
- Malacografia Maderensis, 1854 (Italian publication).
