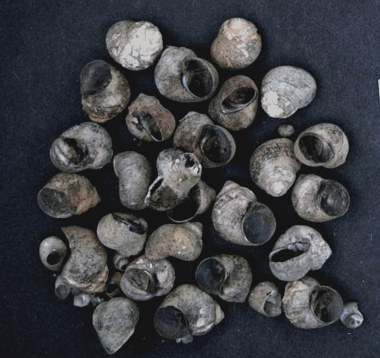
- A collection of shells of Filopaludina sumatrensis (museum specimens at Naturalis Biodiversity Center)

Conservation status
- Least Concern (IUCN 3.1)

Scientific classification
- Kingdom: Animalia
- Phylum: Mollusca
- Class: Gastropoda
- Subclass: Caenogastropoda
- Order: Architaenioglossa
- Family: Viviparidae
- Genus: Filopaludina
- Species: F. sumatrensis

Binomial name
- Filopaludina sumatrensis (Dunker, 1852)

Synonyms
- Filopaludina (Filopaludina) sumatrensis (Dunker, 1852) · accepted, alternate representation; Filopaludina (Filopaludina) sumatrensis sumatrensis (Dunker, 1852) · accepted, alternate representation; Filopaludina sumatrensis sumatrensis (Dunker, 1852) · accepted, alternate representation; Paludina sumatrensis Dunker, 1852

= Filopaludina sumatrensis =

Species of gastropod

Filopaludina sumatrensis is a species of large freshwater snail with a gill and an operculum, an aquatic gastropod mollusc in the family Viviparidae.

== Subspecies ==
- Filopaludina sumatrensis peninsularis Brandt, 1974
- Filopaludina sumatrensis polygramma (Martens, 1860)
- Filopaludina sumatrensis speciosa (Deshayes, 1876)
- Filopaludina sumatrensis sumatrensis (Dunker, 1852) represented as Filopaludina sumatrensis (Dunker, 1852) (alternate representation)

== Distribution ==
This species is found in Cambodia, Indonesia, Laos, Malaysia, Myanmar, Singapore, Thailand and Vietnam.

== Description ==
The width of the shell is 21 mm. The height of the shell is 32 mm.
