= Platycochlium =

Scientific classification
- Kingdom: Animalia
- Phylum: Mollusca
- Class: Gastropoda
- Order: Stylommatophora
- Family: Streptaxidae
- Genus: Platycochlium; Laidlaw, 1950

Type species
- Platycochlium sarawakense Laidlaw, 1950

Genus of gastropods

Platycochlium is a genus of air-breathing land snails, terrestrial pulmonate gastropod mollusks in the family Streptaxidae.

== Distribution ==
The distribution of the genus Platycochlium includes:

- Kalimantan, Borneo, Indonesia

== Species ==
Species within the genus Platycochlium include:

- Platycochlium barnaclei Dance, 1970
- Platycochlium sarawakense Laidlaw, 1950
- Platycochlium saulae Dance, 1970
