= List of non-marine molluscs of Laos =

Location of Laos

The non-marine molluscs of Laos are a part of the fauna of Laos (wildlife of Laos). A number of species of molluscs are found in the wild in Laos. Laos is landlocked country, so there are no marine molluscs.

Almost all groups of the land snail fauna in Laos have been less-well studied than those of neighbouring areas. The Lao People's Democratic Republic, until recently encompassed some of the most significant forest areas remaining in Southeast Asia such as mountainous areas in the north and limestone karsts in central area, and some of the most intact biota left in Asia. Those habitat characteristics also harbor diverse of terrestrial molluscan fauna.

== Freshwater gastropods ==
Freshwater gastropods in Laos include:

Viviparidae

- Filopaludina martensi (Frauenfeld, 1864)
- Filopaludina filosa (Reeve, 1863)
- Filopaludina sumatrensis (Dunker, 1852)

Pachychilidae

- Sulcospira housei (I. Lea, 1856)

Pomatiopsidae

- Neotricula aperta (Temcharoen, 1971)

== Land gastropods ==
Land gastropods in Laos include:

Cyclophoridae

- Cyclophorus dilatatus Heude, 1886
- Cyclophorus floridus (Pfeiffer, 1854)
- Cyclophorus speciosus (Philippi, 1847)
- Scabrina franzhuberi Thach, 2020
- Scabrina laotica Möllendorff, 1897
- Scabrina patera (L. Pfeiffer, 1854)

Clausiliidae

- Garnieria huleschheliae Grego & Szekeres, 2011
- Lindholmiola ahuiri Grego & Szekeres, 2011
- Phaedusa pygmaea Grego & Szekeres, 2011

Diapheridae

- Laoennea carychioides Páll-Gergely, A. Reischütz & Maassen in Páll-Gergely, A. Reischütz, Maassen, Grego & Hunyadi, 2020
- Sinoennea angustistoma Páll-Gergely, A. Reischütz & Maassen in Páll-Gergely, A. Reischütz, Maassen, Grego & Hunyadi, 2020
- Sinoennea euryomphala Inkhavilay & Panha in Inkhavilay, Sutcharit, Tongkerd & Panha, 2016
- Sinoennea infantilis Páll-Gergely & Grego in Páll-Gergely, A. Reischütz, Maassen, Grego & Hunyadi, 2020
- Sinoennea lizae Maassen, 2008
- Sinoennea ljudmilena Páll-Gergely in Páll-Gergely, A. Reischütz, Maassen, Grego & Hunyadi, 2020
- Sinoennea otostoma Páll-Gergely, A. Reischütz & Maassen in Páll-Gergely, A. Reischütz, Maassen, Grego & Hunyadi, 2020
- Sinoennea variabilis Páll-Gergely & Grego in Páll-Gergely, A. Reischütz, Maassen, Grego & Hunyadi, 2020

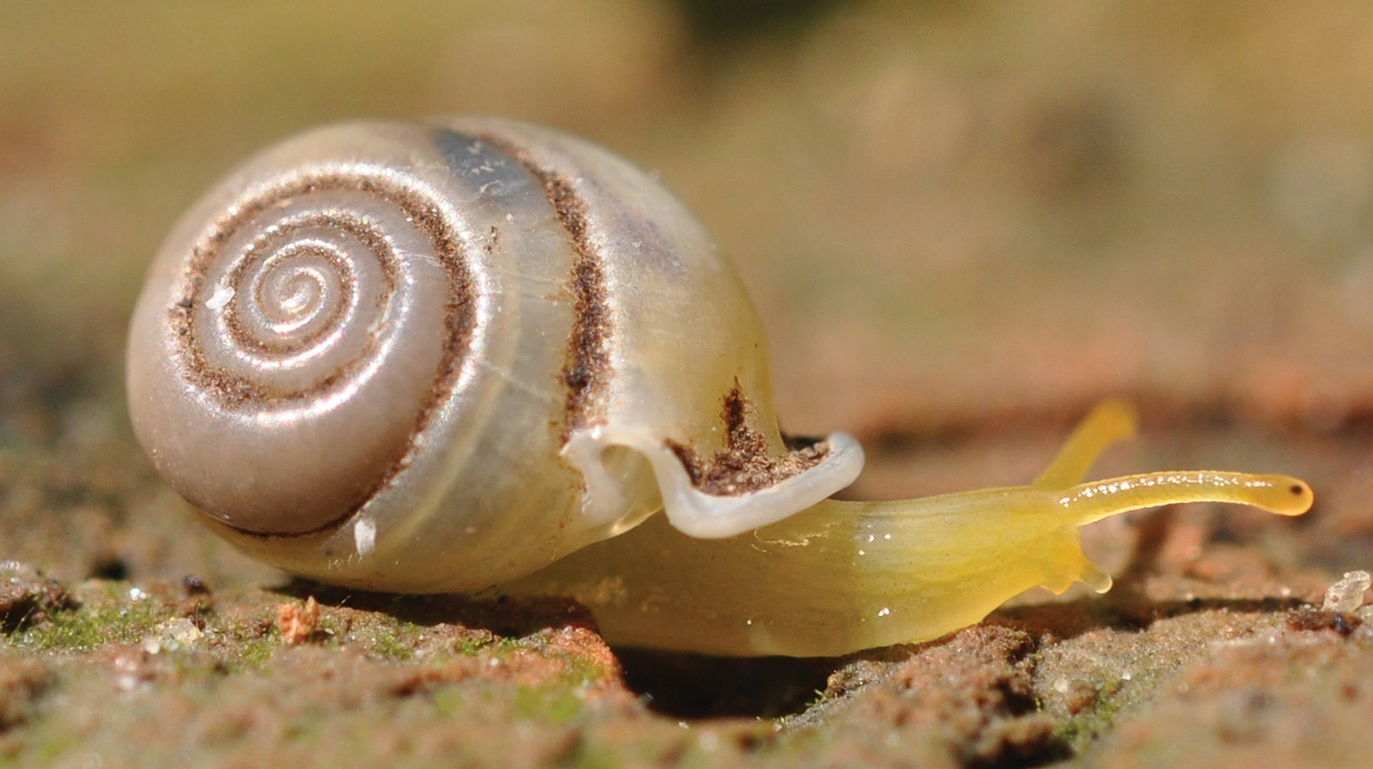
Perrottetia aquilonaria

Streptaxidae - 12 species of Streptaxidae are known from Laos

- Discartemon discus (Pfeiffer, 1853)
- Haploptychius blaisei (Dautzenberg & Fischer, 1905)
- Haploptychius pellucens (Pfeiffer, 1863)
- Haploptychius fischeri (Morlet, 1887)
- Haploptychius porrectus (Pfeiffer, 1863)
- Indoartemon diodonta Inkhavilay & Panha, 2016
- Indoartemon tridens (Möllendorff, 1898)
- Perrottetia aquilonaria Siriboon & Panha, 2013
- Perrottetia daedaleus (Bavay & Dautzenberg, 1908)
- Perrottetia dugasti (Morlet, 1892)
- Perrottetia megadentata Inkhavilay & Panha, 2016
- Perrottetia unidentata Inkhavilay & Panha, 2016
- Stemmatopsis dolium Do, 2021

Plectopylidae - 3 species are known from Laos

- Gudeodiscus messageri (Gude, 1909)
- Hunyadiscus saurini Páll-Gergely, 2016
- Naggsia laomontana (L. Pfeiffer, 1862)

== Freshwater bivalves ==
Freshwater bivalves in Laos include:

== See also ==
Lists of molluscs of surrounding countries:

- List of non-marine molluscs of China
- List of non-marine molluscs of Vietnam
- List of non-marine molluscs of Cambodia
- List of non-marine molluscs of Thailand
- List of non-marine molluscs of Myanmar
