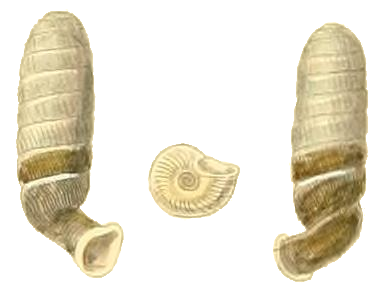
- Drawing of apertural, umbilical and abapertural views of a shell of Diaphera cumingiana.

Scientific classification
- Kingdom: Animalia
- Phylum: Mollusca
- Class: Gastropoda
- Order: Stylommatophora
- Suborder: Achatinina
- Superfamily: Streptaxoidea
- Family: Diapheridae; Panha & Naggs, 2010

= Diapheridae =

Family of gastropods

Diapheridae is a family of air-breathing land snails, terrestrial pulmonate gastropod mollusks in the superfamily Streptaxoidea.

Sutcharit et al. (2010) established the new family Diapheridae within the superfamily Streptaxoidea in 2010.

== Genera ==
The family Diapheridae includes :

- Bruggennea Dance, 1972
- Diaphera Albers, 1850
- Laoennea Páll-Gergely, 2020
- Parasinoennea Z.-Y. Chen & Páll-Gergely, 2020
- Platycochlium Laidlaw, 1950
- Platylennea Páll-Gergely, 2020
- Pupennea Páll-Gergely, 2020
- Rowsonia Páll-Gergely, 2020
- Sinoennea Kobelt, 1904
- Tonkinia Mabille, 1887

Synonym

- Diaphora Martens, 1860 accepted as Diaphera Albers, 1850 (unjustified emendation of the original name)
