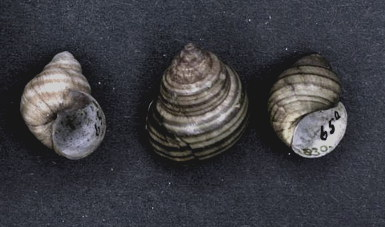
- Three shells of Idiopoma doliaris (museum specimens at Naturalis Biodiversity Center)

Conservation status
- Least Concern (IUCN 3.1)

Scientific classification
- Kingdom: Animalia
- Phylum: Mollusca
- Class: Gastropoda
- Subclass: Caenogastropoda
- Order: Architaenioglossa
- Family: Viviparidae
- Genus: Idiopoma
- Species: I. doliaris

Binomial name
- Idiopoma doliaris (Gould, 1844)

Synonyms
- Filopaludina doliaris (Gould, 1844); Filopaludina (Filopaludina) doliaris (Gould, 1844) · accepted, alternate representation; Paludina digona Blanford, 1869; Paludina doliaris Gould, 1844; Vivipara annendalei Kobelt, 1908; Vivipara annandalei halophila Kobelt, 1908; Vivipara boettgeri mutica Kobelt, 1909; Vivipara doliaris Suvatti, 1950

= Idiopoma doliaris =

Species of gastropod

Idiopoma doliaris is a species of large freshwater snail with a gill and an operculum, an aquatic gastropod mollusk in the family Viviparidae.

== Distribution ==
This species is found in Myanmar and in Thailand.

== Description ==
The width of the shell is 26 mm. The height of the shell is 35 mm.
