= List of non-marine molluscs of Indonesia =

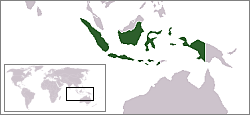
Location of Indonesia

The non-marine molluscs of Indonesia are a part of the molluscan fauna of Indonesia (wildlife of Indonesia). A number of species of non-marine molluscs are found in the wild in Indonesia.

== Freshwater gastropods ==
Neritidae

- Clithon bicolor (Récluz, 1843)
- Clithon faba (G.B. Sowerby I, 1836)
- Clithon olivaceum (Rècluz, 1843)
- Clithon oualaniensis Lesson, 1831
- Neripteron bensoni (Récluz, 1850)
- Nerita articulata Gould, 1847
- Neritina coromandeliana Sowerby, 1832
- Neritina pulligera (Linnaeus, 1767)
- Neritina sulculosa von Martens, 1875
- Neritina turrita (Gmelin, 1791)
- Neritina violacea (Gmelin, 1791)
- Neritina zigzag Lamarck, 1822
- Neritodryas subsulcata (Sowerby, 1836)
- Septaria lineata (Lamarck, 1816)

Neritiliidae

- Neritilia vulgaris Kano & Kase, 2003

Pachychilidae

- Brotia costula Brandt, 1974
- Brotia pageli (Thiele, 1908)
- Faunus ater (Linnaeus, 1758)
- Sulcospira kawaluensis Marwoto & Isnaningsih, 2012
- Sulcospira pisum (Brot, 1868)
- Sulcospira sulcospira (Mousson, 1849)
- Sulcospira testudinaria (von dem Busch, 1842)
- Tylomelania abendanoni (Kruimel, 1913)
- Tylomelania amphiderita Rintelen, Bouchet & Glaubrecht, 2007
- Tylomelania bakara Rintelen & Glaubrecht, 2003
- Tylomelania baskasti Rintelen & Glaubrecht, 2008
- Tylomelania carbo Sarasin & Sarasin, 1897
- Tylomelania carota (Sarasin & Sarasin, 1898)
- Tylomelania celebicola (Sarasin & Sarasin, 1898)
- Tylomelania centaurus (Sarasin & Sarasin, 1898)
- Tylomelania confusa Rintelen, Bouchet & Glaubrecht, 2007
- Tylomelania connectens Sarasin & Sarasin, 1898
- Tylomelania gemmifera (Sarasin & Sarasin, 1897)
- Tylomelania hannelorae Rintelen & Glaubrecht, 2008
- Tylomelania helmuti Rintelen & Glaubrecht, 2003
- Tylomelania inconspicua Rintelen, Bouchet & Glaubrecht, 2007
- Tylomelania insulaesacrae (Sarasin & Sarasin, 1897)
- Tylomelania kristinae Rintelen, Bouchet & Glaubrecht, 2007
- Tylomelania kruimeli Rintelen & Glaubrecht, 2003
- Tylomelania kuli (Sarasin & Sarasin, 1898)
- Tylomelania lalemae (Kruimel, 1913)
- Tylomelania mahalonensis (Kruimel, 1913)
- Tylomelania mahalonica (Kruimel, 1913)
- Tylomelania marwotoae Rintelen, Bouchet & Glaubrecht, 2007
- Tylomelania masapensis (Kruimel, 1913)
- Tylomelania matannensis Rintelen, Bouchet & Glaubrecht, 2007
- Tylomelania molesta (Sarasin & Sarasin, 1897)
- Tylomelania monacha (Sarasin & Sarasin, 1899)
- Tylomelania neritiformis (Sarasin & Sarasin, 1897)
- Tylomelania palicolarum (Sarasin & Sarasin, 1897)
- Tylomelania patriarchalis (Sarasin & Sarasin, 1897)
- Tylomelania perconica (Sarasin & Sarasin, 1898)
- Tylomelania perfecta (Mousson, 1849)
- Tylomelania porcellanica Sarasin & Sarasin, 1897
- Tylomelania robusta (Martens, 1897)
- Tylomelania sarasinorum (Kruimel, 1913)
- Tylomelania scalariopsis (Sarasin & Sarasin, 1897)
- Tylomelania sinabartfeldi Rintelen & Glaubrecht, 2008
- Tylomelania tominangensis (Kruimel, 1913)
- Tylomelania tomoriensis (Sarasin & Sarasin, 1898)
- Tylomelania toradjarum (Sarasin & Sarasin, 1897)
- Tylomelania towutensis (Sarasin & Sarasin, 1897)
- Tylomelania towutica (Kruimel, 1913)
- Tylomelania turriformis Rintelen, Bouchet & Glaubrecht, 2007
- Tylomelania wallacei (Reeve, 1860)
- Tylomelania wesseli Rintelen, Bouchet & Glaubrecht, 2007
- Tylomelania wolterecki Rintelen, Bouchet & Glaubrecht, 2007
- Tylomelania zeamais (Sarasin & Sarasin, 1897)

Assimineidae

- Assiminea microsculpta Nevill, 1880
- Assiminea philippinica Boettger, 1887
- Cyclotropis bedaliensis (Rensch, 1934)
- Cyclotropis carinata (Lea, 1856)
- Cyclotropis papuensis (Tapparone-Canefri, 1883)
- Cyclotropis terae Brandt, 1974
- Omphalotropis ceramensis Pfeiffer, 1862
- Paludinella halophila Rensch, 1934
- Pseudassiminea waigiouensis (Sykes, 1903)
- Pseudocyclotus rugatellus (Tapparone-Canefri, 1883)

Clenchiellidae

- Clenchiella microscopica (Nevill, 1877)

Planorbidae

- Gyraulus convexiusculus (Hutton, 1849)
- Gyraulus terraesacrae Rensch, 1934
- Intha umbilicalis (Benson, 1836)
- Miratesta celebensis P. & F. Sarasin, 1898
- Physastra moluccensis Lesson, 1831

Bulinidae

- Indoplanorbis exustus (Deshayes, 1834)

Lymnaeidae

- Austropeplea lessoni (Deshayes, 1830)
- Radix viridis (Quoy & Gaimard, 1833)

Cultelidae

- Neosolen aquaedulcioris Ghosh, 1920

Viviparidae

- Angulyagra oxytropis (Benson, 1836)
- Filopaludina martensi (Frauenfeld, 1865)
- Filopaludina sumatrensis (Dunker, 1852)
- Idiopoma javanica von dem Busch, 1844

Bithyniidae

- Gabbia lacustris Van Benthem Jutting, 1963

Iravadiidae

- Iravadia ornata Blanford, 1867
- Iravadia rohdei (Brandt, 1968)

Pomatiopsidae

- Oncomelania hupensis Gredler, 1881

Ampullariidae

- Pila ampullacea (Linnaeus, 1758)
- Pila polita (Deshayes, 1830)
- Pila scutata (Mousson, 1848)
- Pomacea canaliculata (Lamarck, 1822)
- Pomacea lineata (Spix in Wagner, 1827)

Stenothyridae

- Stenothyra cyrtochilavan Benthem Jutting, 1959
- Stenothyra glabrata (Adams, 1851)
- Stenothyra monilifera (Benson, 1856)
- Stenothyra polita A. Adams, 1851
- Stenothyra ventricosa Quoy & Gaimard, 1834

Tateidae

- Sulawesidrobia abreui Zielske, Glaubrecht & Haase, 2011
- Sulawesidrobia anceps Zielske, Glaubrecht & Haase, 2011
- Sulawesidrobia bicolor Zielske, Glaubrecht & Haase, 2011
- Sulawesidrobia datar Zielske, Glaubrecht & Haase, 2011
- Sulawesidrobia mahalonaensis Zielske, Glaubrecht & Haase, 2011
- Sulawesidrobia megalodon Zielske, Glaubrecht & Haase, 2011
- Sulawesidrobia perempuan Zielske, Glaubrecht & Haase, 2011
- Sulawesidrobia soedjatmokoi Zielske, Glaubrecht & Haase, 2011
- Sulawesidrobia towutiensis Zielske, Glaubrecht & Haase, 2011
- Sulawesidrobia yunusi Zielske, Glaubrecht & Haase, 2011

Potamididae

- Cerithium coralium Kiener, 1841
- Telescopium telescopium Linnaeus, 1758

Thiaridae

- Melanoides jugicostis (Hanley & Theobald, 1876)
- Mieniplotia scabra (Müller, 1774)
- Sermyla riqueti (Grateloup, 1840)
- Tarebia granifera (Lamarck, 1816)
- Thiara amarula (Linnaeus, 1758)
- Thiara plicaria Born, 1780
- Thiara rudicostis Brot, 1874
- Thiara rudis (Lea, 1850)

== Land gastropods ==
Achatinellidae

- Elasmias sundanum (Möllendorff, 1897)
- Lamellidea subcylindrica (Möllendorff & Quadras, 1894)

Achatinidae

- Achatina fulica Bowdich, 1822
- Allopeas clavulinum (Potiez & Michaud, 1838)
- Allopeas gracile (Hutton, 1834)
- Glessula sumatrana (Martens, 1864)
- Paropeas achatinaceum (Pfeiffer, 1846)
- Paropeas acutissimum (Mousson, 1857)
- Subulina octona (Bruguière, 1792)

Ariophantidae

- Hemiplecta humphreysiana (Lea, 1841)
- Macrochlamys amboinensis (Martens, 1864)
- Macrochlamys spiralifer Vermeulen, 1996
- Parmarion martensi Simroth, 1893
- Parmarion pupillaris Humbert, 1929

Assimineidae

- Omphalotropis columellaris Quadras and Möllendorff, 1893

Bradybaenidae

- Bradybaena similaris (Férussac, 1821)

Camaenidae

- Amphidromus adamsi (Reeve, 1848)
- Amphidromus alticola Fulton, 1896
- Amphidromus ameliae B. Dharma, 2007
- Amphidromus banksi Butot, 1955
- Amphidromus bulowi Fruhstorfer, 1905
- Amphidromus djajasasmitai Dharma, 1993
- Amphidromus elviae Dharma, 2007
- Amphidromus elvinae Dharma, 2007
- Amphidromus enganoensis (Fulton, 1896)
- Amphidromus enganoensis fruhstorferi Laidlaw, 1954
- Amphidromus enganoensis sykesi Fruhstorfer, 1905
- Amphidromus filozonatus (von Martens, 1867)
- Amphidromus furcillatus (Mousson, 1849)
- Amphidromus heerianus (Pfeiffer, 1871)
- Amphidromus ilsa B. Rensch, 1933
- Amphidromus inversus O. F. Müller, 1774
- Amphidromus inversus andamanensis (L. Pfeiffer, 1871)
- Amphidromus javanicus (Sowerby, 1841)
- Amphidromus minutus
- Amphidromus niasensis Fulton, 1907
- Amphidromus palaceus (Mousson, 1848)
- Amphidromus palaceus lemongensis
- Amphidromus palaceus taloensis
- Amphidromus palaceus tanggamusensis
- Amphidromus perversus (Linnaeus, 1758)
- Amphidromus porcellanus (Mousson, 1848)
- Amphidromus puspae Dharma, 1993
- Amphidromus ristiae Dharma, 2007
- Amphidromus sekincauensis Thach & F. Huber, 2014
- Amphidromus semifrenatus Martens, 1900
- Amphidromus sowerby
- Amphidromus sumatranus von Martens, 1864
- Amphidromus sumatranus jacobsoni Laidlaw, 1954
- Amphidromus sumatranus singalangensis Rolle, 1908
- Amphidromus webbi Fulton, 1907
- Amphidromus webbi babiensis Laidlaw, 1954
- Amphidromus webbi simalurensis Fulton, 1907
- Chloritis breviseta (Pfeiffer, 1862)
- Chloritis crassula (Philippi, 1844)
- Chloritis fruhstorferi (Möllendorff, 1897)
- Chloritis pandjangensis Rolle, 1908
- Chloritis rufofasciata
- Chloritis sykesi Gude, 1906
- Chloritis tabularis Gude, 1903
- Chloritis tomentosa (L. Pfeiffer, 1854)
- Chloritis transversalis (Mousson, 1857)
- Ganesella acris (Benson, 1859)
- Ganesella bantamensis (E. A. Smith, 1887)
- Ganesella bottgeri H. Rolle, 1908
- Ganesella conulus
- Landouria abdidalem Nurinsiyah, Neiber & Hausdorf, 2019
- Landouria ciliocincta (Möllendorff, 1897)
- Landouria conoidea (Leschke, 1914)
- Landouria costulata (Martens, 1892)
- Landouria davini Dharma, 2015
- Landouria dharmai Nurinsiyah, Neiber & Hausdorf, 2019
- Landouria epiplatia (Möllendorff, 1897)
- Landouria intumescens (Martens, 1867)
- Landouria leucochila (Gude, 1905)
- Landouria madurensis Nurinsiyah, Neiber & Hausdorf, 2019
- Landouria menorehensis Nurinsiyah, Neiber & Hausdorf, 2019
- Landouria mentaweiensis
- Landouria monticola van Benthem Jutting, 1950
- Landouria moussoniana (Martens, 1867)
- Landouria naggsi Nurinsiyah, Neiber & Hausdorf, 2019
- Landouria nodifera Nurinsiyah, Neiber & Hausdorf, 2019
- Landouria nusakambangensis Nurinsiyah, Neiber & Hausdorf, 2019
- Landouria pacitanensis Nurinsiyah, Neiber & Hausdorf, 2019
- Landouria pakidulan Nurinsiyah, Neiber & Hausdorf, 2019
- Landouria parahyangensis Nurinsiyah, Neiber & Hausdorf, 2019
- Landouria petrukensis Nurinsiyah, Neiber & Hausdorf, 2019
- Landouria rotatoria (Pfeiffer, 1842)
- Landouria schepmani (Möllendorff, 1897)
- Landouria sewuensis Nurinsiyah, Neiber & Hausdorf, 2019
- Landouria smimensis (Mousson, 1848)
- Landouria sukoliloensis Nurinsiyah, Neiber & Hausdorf, 2019
- Landouria sumatrana (Martens, 1864)
- Landouria tholiformis Nurinsiyah, Neiber & Hausdorf, 2019
- Landouria tonywhitteni Nurinsiyah, Neiber & Hausdorf, 2019
- Landouria winteriana (Pfeiffer, 1842)
- Landouria zonifera Nurinsiyah, Neiber & Hausdorf, 2019
- Planispira aldrichi Henderson, 1898
- Planispira gabata atjehensis
- Planispira gabata smithi
- Planispira quadrivolvis (Martens, 1865)
- Pseudopartula arborascens Butot, 1954
- Pseudopartula dohertyi (Aldrich, 1892)
- Pseudopartula galericulum (Mousson, 1848)
- Pseudopartula galericulum gedeana
- Vulnus wallacei

Cerastidae

- Rhachistia zonulata (Pfeiffer, 1846)

Charopidae

- Discocharopa aperta (Möllendorff, 1888)
- Philalanka kusana (Aldrich, 1889)
- Philalanka nannophya Rensch, 1932
- Philalanka thienemanni Rensch, 1932
- Philalanka tjibodasensis (Leschke, 1914)

Chronidae

- Kaliella barrakporensis (Pfeiffer, 1852)

Clausiliidae

- Juttingia (Pseudohemiphaedusa) loosjesi Nordsieck, 2002
- Juttingia schlueteri (O. Boettger, 1879)
- Oospira acehensis Dharma & Szekeres, 2009
- Oospira butoti Grego & Szekeres, 2009
- Oospira cornea (Küster, 1844)
- Oospira dancei Dharma & Szekeres, 2009
- Oospira jacobsoni (Loosjes, 1953)
- Oospira javana (Pfeiffer, 1841)
- Oospira orientalis (L. Pfeiffer, 1842)
- Oospira salacana (Boettger, 1890)
- Oospira scalariformis (Loosjes, 1953)
- Oospira thrausta (Loosjes, 1953)
- Paraphaedusa schwaneri (E. Martens, 1867)
- Phaedusa dorsoplicata Loosjes, 1953
- Phaedusa timorensis Nordsieck, 2007

Cyclophoridae

- Alycaeus crenilabris Möllendorff, 1897
- Alycaeus crenilabris crenilabris Möllendorff, 1897
- Alycaeus crenilabris laevis van Benthem Jutting, 1959
- Alycaeus crenilabris latecostatus van Benthem Jutting, 1959
- Alycaeus liratulus (Preston, 1907)
- Alycaeus praetextus van Benthem Jutting, 1959
- Alycaeus reinhardti sabangensis (B. Rensch, 1933)
- Alycaeus sumatranus (Martens, 1900)
- Alycaeus wilhelminae Maassen, 2006
- Chamalycaeus crassicollis van Benthem Jutting, 1959
- Chamalycaeus fruhstorferi (Möllendorff, 1897)
- Chamalycaeus longituba (Martens, 1864)
- Crossopoma albersi (L. Pfeiffer, 1847)
- Crossopoma bathyrhaphe (E. A. Smith, 1878)
- Crossopoma cornuvenatorium (Gmelin, 1791)
- Crossopoma enganoense Henderson, 1898
- Crossopoma inflamatum
- Crossopoma nieli van Benthem Jutting, 1959
- Crossopoma planorbulum (Lamarck, 1816)
- Crossopoma spiroliratus
- Cyclohelix crocata jacobsoni
- Cyclohelix kibleri (Fulton, 1907)
- Cyclohelix kibleri babiensis Laidlaw, 1957
- Cyclohelix kibleri simalurensis Laidlaw, 1957
- Cyclohelix nicobarica Pfeiffer, 1865
- Cyclotus amboinensis (Pfeiffer, 1854)
- Cyclotus batchianensis Pfeiffer, 1861
- Cyclotus bialatus Möllendorff, 1902
- Cyclotus corniculum (Mousson, 1849)
- Cyclotus discoideus G. B. Sowerby I, 1843
- Cyclotus discriminendus B. Rensch, 1934
- Cyclotus lepidotus Vermeulen, 1996
- Cyclotus lombockensis (Smith, 1898)
- Cyclotus mindaiensis (Bock, 1881)
- Cyclotus natunensis Smith, 1894
- Cyclotus niasensis Fulton, 1907
- Cyclotus politus (G. B. Sowerby I, 1843)
- Cyclotus pyrostoma Smith, 1896
- Cyclotus rostellatus (L. Pfeiffer, 1851)
- Cyclotus simplicissimus B. Rensch, 1933
- Cyclotus subflammulatus Pfeiffer, 1861
- Cyclotus sumatranus (Martens, 1864)
- Cyclotus vicinus Smith, 1896
- Cyclophorus courbeti Ancey, 1888
- Cyclophorus egregius Martens, 1900
- Cyclophorus eximius
- Cyclophorus eximius rouyeri
- Cyclophorus hebereri B. Rensch, 1933
- Cyclophorus ouwensianus
- Cyclophorus perdix (Broderip & G. B. Sowerby I, 1830)
- Cyclophorus perdix aquilus
- Cyclophorus perdix bankanus
- Cyclophorus rafflesi (Broderip & Sowerby, 1833)
- Cyclophorus schepmani Laidlaw, 1957
- Cyclophorus taeniatus (L. Pfeiffer, 1855)
- Cyclophorus tuba (G. B. Sowerby I, 1842)
- Cyclophorus tuba plicifera
- Dicharax longituba (Martens, 1867)
- Ditropopsis aenigmatica (van Benthem Jutting, 1963)
- Ditropopsis alta Greke, 2014
- Ditropopsis benthemjuttingi Greke, 2011
- Ditropopsis fruhstorferi (Möllendorff, 1897)
- Ditropopsis fultoni E. A. Smith, 1897
- Ditropopsis halmaherica Greke, 2014
- Ditropopsis heterospirifera (van Benthem Jutting, 1958)
- Ditropopsis ingenua (O. Boettger, 1891)
- Ditropopsis magna Greke, 2014
- Ditropopsis majalibit Greke, 2014
- Ditropopsis mirabilis Greke, 2011
- Ditropopsis moellendorffi (O. Boettger, 1891)
- Ditropopsis monticola Greke, 2014
- Ditropopsis obiensis Greke, 2011
- Ditropopsis pallidioperculata Greke, 2014
- Ditropopsis papuana E. A. Smith, 1897
- Ditropopsis perlucidula (Greke, 2011)
- Ditropopsis pyramis Greke, 2014
- Ditropopsis spiralis (O. Boettger, 1891)
- Ditropopsis tamarau Greke, 2014
- Ditropopsis telnovi Greke, 2014
- Ditropopsis tritonensis Greke, 2011
- Ditropopsis unicarinata Greke, 2014
- Ditropopsis waigeoensis Greke, 2014
- Ditropopsis wallacei Greke, 2014
- Japonia ciliferum (Mousson, 1849)
- Japonia ciliocinctum (von Martens, 1865)
- Japonia convexum Möllendorff, 1897
- Japonia garreli (Eydoux & Souleyet, 1852)
- Japonia grandipilum Boettger, 1891
- Japonia marangense
- Japonia mundum
- Japonia obliquistriatum Bullen, 1904
- Japonia townsendi (Crosse, 1879)
- Leptopoma altum Möllendorff, 1897
- Leptopoma bodjoense E. A. Smith, 1888
- Leptopoma bodjoense mentaweiense
- Leptopoma fultoni Aldrich, 1898
- Leptopoma niasense H. C. Fulton, 1907
- Leptopoma perlucidum (de Grateloup, 1840)
- Leptopoma sericatum (L. Pfeiffer, 1853)
- Leptopoma vitreum (Lesson, 1826)
- Opisthoporus corniculum (Mousson, 1849)
- Pincerna yanseni Páll-Gergely, 2017
- Pterocyclos aspersus Bullen, 1906
- Pterocyclos celebensis (Smith, 1896)
- Schistoloma sumatranum (Dohrn, 1881)
- Schistoloma sectilabrum (Gould, 1843)
- Theobaldius dautzenbergi (Fulton, 1907)

Diplommatinidae

- Arinia yanseni Nurinsiyah & Hausdorf, 2017
- Diplommatina auriculata Möllendorff, 1897
- Diplommatina diplostoma B. Rensch, 1931
- Diplommatina duplicilabra van Benthem Jutting, 1948
- Diplommatina halimunensis Nurinsiyah & Hausdorf, 2017
- Diplommatina heryantoi Nurinsiyah & Hausdorf, 2017
- Diplommatina hortulana Leschke, 1914
- Diplommatina jonabletti Greke, 2017
- Diplommatina kakenca Nurinsiyah & Hausdorf, 2017
- Diplommatina majapahit Greke, 2019
- Diplommatina mongondowensis Maassen, 2007
- Diplommatina nevilli (Crosse, 1879)
- Diplommatina planicollis Möllendorff, 1897
- Diplommatina riedeli Maassen, 2007
- Diplommatina ristiae Nurinsiyah & Hausdorf, 2017
- Diplommatina soputensis Sarasin & Sarasin, 1899
- Diplommatina stenoacron Vermeulen & Khalik, 2021
- Diplommatina strophosa Benthem-Jutting, 1959
- Diplommatina tardigrada Benthem-Jutting, 1959
- Diplommatina tweediei Laidlaw, 1949
- Plectostoma kitteli (Maassen, 2002)

Dyakiidae

- Dyakia clypeus (Mousson, 1857)
- Dyakia rumphii (von dem Busch, 1842)
- Elaphroconcha bataviana (von dem Busch, 1842)
- Elaphroconcha javacensis (Férussac, 1821)
- Elaphroconcha patens (Martens, 1898)

Ellobiidae

- Auriculastra subula (Qouy & Gaimard, 1832)
- Cylindrotis quadrasi Moellendorff, 1895
- Ellobium aurisjudae Linnaeus, 1758
- Ellobium aurismidae Röding, 1798
- Laemodonta bella (H. & A. Adams, 1855)
- Laemodonta punctigera (H. & A. Adams, 1854)
- Melampus sincaporensis Pfeiffer, 1855
- Melampus sulculosus von Martens, 1865

Enidae

- Apoecus glandula (Mousson, 1848)
- Apoecus tenggericus (Möllendorff, 1897)
- Ena glandula A. Mousson, 1848

Euconulidae

- Coneuplecta microconus (Mousson, 1865)
- Coneuplecta olivacea Vermeullen, 1996
- Coneuplecta sitaliformis (Möllendorff, 1897)
- Lamprocystis infans (L. Pfeiffer, 1854)
- Liardetia angigyra (Möllendorff, 1897)
- Liardetia convexoconica (Möllendorff, 1897)
- Liardetia dolium (Pfeiffer, 1846)
- Liardetia pisum (Möllendorff, 1897)
- Liardetia scandens (Cox, 1872)
- Microcystina chionodiscus Vermeulen, 1996
- Microcystina circumlineata (Möllendorff, 1897)
- Microcystina fruhstorferi (Möllendorff, 1897)
- Microcystina gratilla Van Benthem-Jutting, 1950
- Microcystina sinica Möllendorff, 1885
- Microcystina subglobosa Möllendorff, 1897
- Queridomus fimbriosus (Quadras & Möllendorff, 1894)

Ferussaciidae

- Geostilbia aperta (Swainson, 1840)

Gastrocoptidae

- Gastrocopta pediculus (Shuttleworth, 1852)
- Gastrocopta recondita (Tapparone-Canefri, 1883)
- Gastrocopta servilis (Gould, 1843)

Helicarionidae

- Helicarion albellus von Martens, 1867
- Helicarion perfragilis Möllendorff, 1897
- Helicarion radiatulus (Möllendorff, 1897)
- Sundavitrina fruhstorferi (Möllendorff, 1897)

Helicinidae

- Geophorus oxytropis (Gray, 1839)

Hydrocenidae

- Georissa williamsi Godwin-Austen, 1889

Philomycidae

- Meghimatium striatum van Hasselt, 1824

Punctidae

- Paralaoma javana (Möllendorff, 1897)

Pupinidae

- Pupina bipalatalis Boettger, 1890
- Pupina compacta (Möllendorff, 1897)
- Pupina junghuni Martens, 1867
- Pupina treubi Boettger, 1890
- Pupina verbeeki Möllendorff, 1897

Streptaxidae

- Gulella bicolor (Hutton, 1834)

Succineidae

- Succinea listeri Smith, 1888
- Succinea minuta Martens, 1867

Trochomorphidae

- Geotrochus bicolor (Martens, 1864)
- Geotrochus conus (Philippi, 1841)
- Trochomorpha appropinquata (Martens, 1864)
- Trochomorpha bicolor Martens, 1864
- Trochomorpha concolor Boettger, 1890
- Trochomorpha strubelli Boettger, 1890
- Videna strubelli Boettger, 1890

Truncatellidae

- Truncatella guerinii Villa & Villa, 1841

Valloniidae

- Pupisoma dioscoricola (C. B. Adams, 1845)
- Pupisoma orcula (Benson, 1850)

Veronicellidae

- Filicaulis bleekerii (Keferstein, 1865)
- Laevicaulis alte (Férussac, 1822)
- Sarasinula plebeia (P. Fischer, 1868)

Vertiginidae

- Gyliotrachela fruhstorferi (Möllendorff, 1897)
- Nesopupa malayana (Issel, 1874)
- Nesopupa nannodes (Quadras and Möllendorff, 1898)
- Nesopupa novopommerana Rensch, 1932

== Freshwater bivalves ==
Cyrenidae

- Corbicula fluminea (Müller, 1774)
- Corbicula lamarckiana Prime, 1864
- Corbicula loehensis Kruimel, 1913
- Corbicula matannensis Sarasin & Sarasin, 1898
- Corbicula moltkiana Prime, 1878
- Corbicula possoensis (Sarasin & Sarasin, 1898)
- Polymesoda bengalensis (Lamarck, 1818)

Mytilidae

- Brachidontes arcuatulus Hanley, 1844

Unionidae

- Physunio superbus (Lea, 1843)
- Pilsbryoconcha exilis (Lea, 1838)
- Pseudodon mouhotii (Lea, 1863)
- Pseudodon vondembuschianus (Lea, 1840)
- Rectidens sumatrensis Dunker, 1852
- Sinanodonta woodiana (Lea, 1834)
- Trapezoideus misellus Morelet, 1865
- Uniandra contradens Lea, 1838
- Uniandra semmelinki von Martens, 1891

Sphaeriidae

- Pisidium annandalei Prashad, 1925
- Pisidium javanum van Benthem Jutting, 1931
- Pisidium sumatranum Martens, 1897

== See also ==
- List of marine molluscs of Indonesia

Lists of non-marine molluscs of surrounding countries:

- List of non-marine molluscs of Australia
- List of non-marine molluscs of East Timor
- List of non-marine molluscs of Malaysia
- List of non-marine molluscs of Papua New Guinea
- List of non-marine molluscs of the Philippines
- List of non-marine molluscs of Singapore
