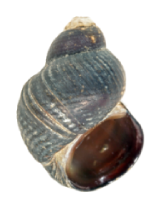
- Apertural view of a shell of Tylomelania neritiformis
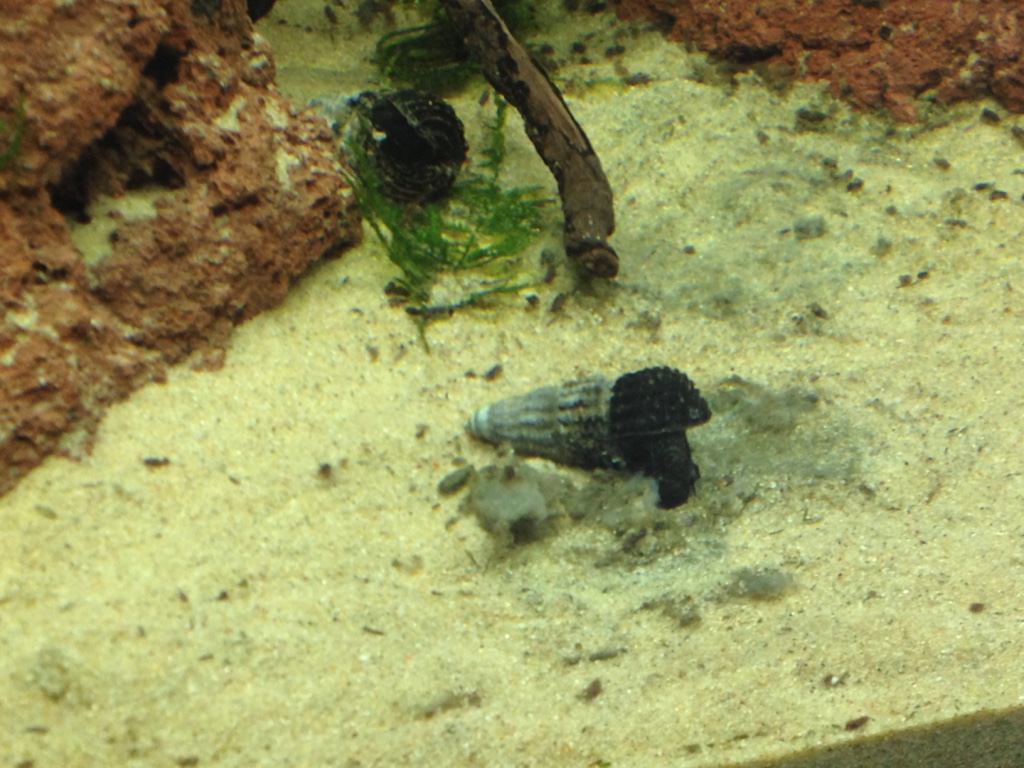
- Two Tylomelania sp.

Scientific classification
- Kingdom: Animalia
- Phylum: Mollusca
- Class: Gastropoda
- Subclass: Caenogastropoda
- Order: incertae sedis
- Family: Pachychilidae
- Genus: Tylomelania; Sarasin & Sarasin, 1897

Diversity
- 46 described species

= Tylomelania =

Genus of gastropods

Tylomelania is a genus of freshwater snails which have an operculum, aquatic gastropod mollusks in the family Pachychilidae. In the aquarium hobby, snails from this genus are commonly known as "rabbit snails" (not to be confused with sea hares).

A sister group (the closest relative) of Tylomelania is genus Pseudopotamis (two species living on the Torres Strait Islands). Tylomelania and Pseudopotamis split in the Middle Miocene c. 19.5 Mya.

== Distribution ==
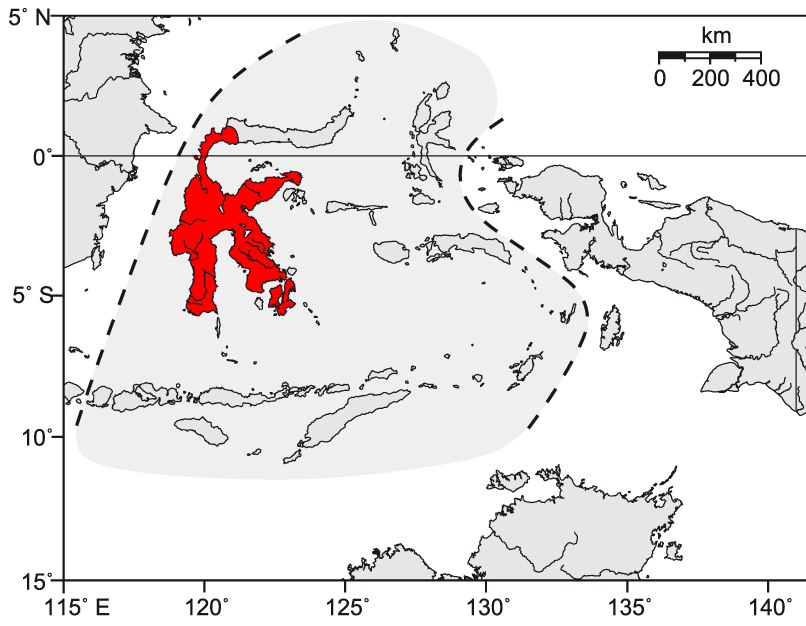
Distribution map of Tylomelania (red area) cover the majority of Sulawesi. Grey area with dashed line is showing Wallacea.

Tylomelania are endemic to Sulawesi in Indonesia, with the vast majority restricted to Lake Poso and the Malili Lake system (consisting of Matano and Towuti, and the smaller Lontoa (Wawantoa), Mahalona, Masapi).

They most likely cannot inhabit altitudes above roughly 700 m (2,300 ft).

== Species ==
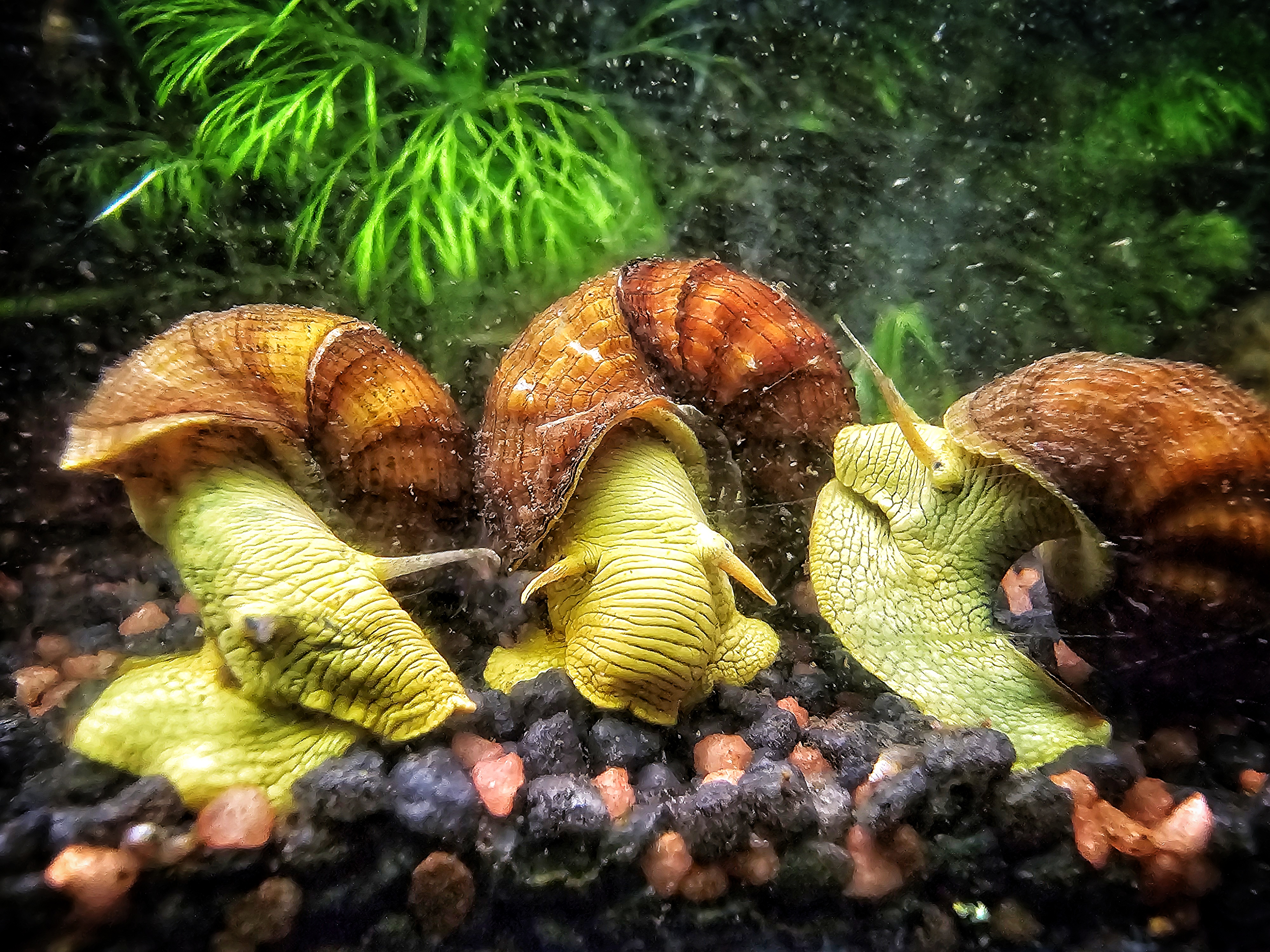
Yellow rabbit snail tylomelania

There were known 34 described species in 2005. Thomas von Rintelen with colleagues described 15 new species of Tylomelania in 2003–2008.

Tylomelania species diversification started in c. 5.4 Mya and was probably caused by the late Miocene and Pliocene orogeny.

Species within the genus Tylomelania include:

- Tylomelania abendanoni (Kruimel, 1913)
- Tylomelania amphiderita (von Rintelen, Bouchet & Glaubrecht, 2007)
- Tylomelania bakara (von Rintelen & Glaubrecht, 2003)
- Tylomelania baskasti (von Rintelen & Glaubrecht, 2008)
- Tylomelania carbo (Sarasin & Sarasin, 1897)
- Tylomelania carota (Sarasin & Sarasin, 1898)
- Tylomelania celebicola (Sarasin & Sarasin, 1898)
- Tylomelania centaurus (Sarasin & Sarasin, 1898)
- Tylomelania confusa (von Rintelen, Bouchet & Glaubrecht, 2007)
- Tylomelania connectens (Sarasin & Sarasin, 1898)
- Tylomelania gemmifera (Sarasin & Sarasin, 1897)
- Tylomelania hannelorae (von Rintelen & Glaubrecht, 2008)
- Tylomelania helmuti (von Rintelen & Glaubrecht, 2003)
- Tylomelania inconspicua (von Rintelen, Bouchet & Glaubrecht, 2007)
- Tylomelania insulaesacrae (Sarasin & Sarasin, 1897)
- Tylomelania kristinae (von Rintelen, Bouchet & Glaubrecht, 2007)
- Tylomelania kruimeli (von Rintelen & Glaubrecht, 2003)
- Tylomelania kuli (Sarasin & Sarasin, 1898)
- Tylomelania lalemae (Kruimel, 1913)
- Tylomelania mahalonensis (Kruimel, 1913) – synonym: Tylomelania mahalonica (Kruimel, 1913)
- Tylomelania marwotoae (von Rintelen, Bouchet & Glaubrecht, 2007)
- Tylomelania masapensis (Kruimel, 1913)
- Tylomelania matannensis (von Rintelen, Bouchet & Glaubrecht, 2007)
- Tylomelania molesta (Sarasin & Sarasin, 1897)
- Tylomelania monacha (Sarasin & Sarasin, 1899)
- Tylomelania neritiformis (Sarasin & Sarasin, 1897 – type species)
- Tylomelania palicolarum (Sarasin & Sarasin, 1897)
- Tylomelania patriarchalis (Sarasin & Sarasin, 1897)
- Tylomelania perconica (Sarasin & Sarasin, 1898)
- Tylomelania perfecta (Mousson, 1849)
- Tylomelania porcellanica (Sarasin & Sarasin, 1897)
- Tylomelania robusta (Martens, 1897)
- Tylomelania sarasinorum (Kruimel, 1913)
- Tylomelania scalariopsis (Sarasin & Sarasin, 1897)
- Tylomelania sinabartfeldi (von Rintelen & Glaubrecht, 2008)
- Tylomelania solitaria
- Tylomelania tominangensis (Kruimel, 1913)
- Tylomelania tomoriensis (Sarasin & Sarasin, 1898)
- Tylomelania toradjarum (Sarasin & Sarasin, 1897)
- Tylomelania towutensis (Sarasin & Sarasin, 1897)
- Tylomelania towutica (Kruimel, 1913)
- Tylomelania turriformis (von Rintelen, Bouchet & Glaubrecht, 2007)
- Tylomelania wallacei (Reeve, 1860)
- Tylomelania wesseli (von Rintelen, Bouchet & Glaubrecht, 2007)
- Tylomelania wolterecki (von Rintelen, Bouchet & Glaubrecht, 2007)
- Tylomelania zeamais (Sarasin & Sarasin, 1897)

== Description ==
In species within the genus, the albumen gland is very large. The pallial oviduct evolved into a uterine brood, which releases shelled juvenile snails. Compared to other aquatic snails, many species of Tylomelania are known to be the few groups of snails that are not hermaphroditic but rather dioecious. Comparison of apertural views of shells of twenty Tylomelania species are below, though are not of proper scale:

Tylomelania abendanoni

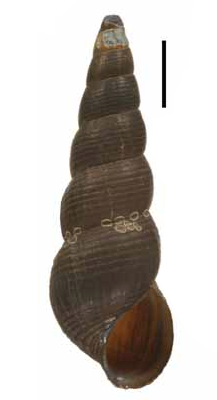
Tylomelania baskasti

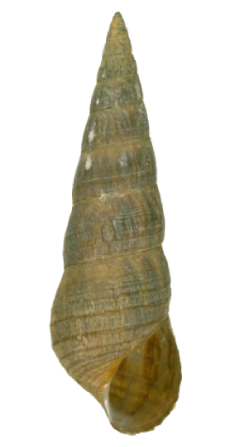
Tylomelania carota

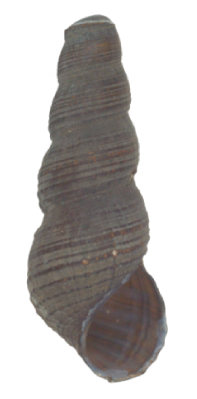
Tylomelania celebicola

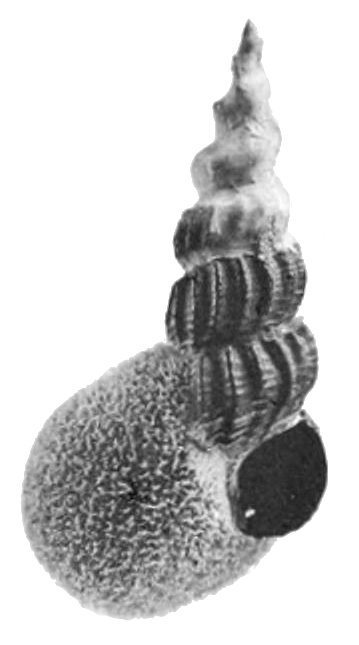
Tylomelania centaurus

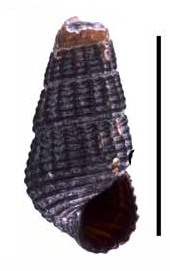
Tylomelania hannelorae

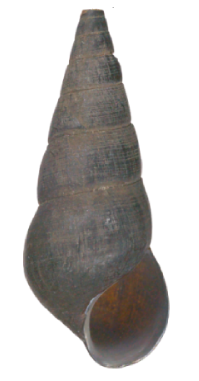
Tylomelania helmuti

Tylomelania lalemae

Tylomelania mahalonensis

Tylomelania masapensis

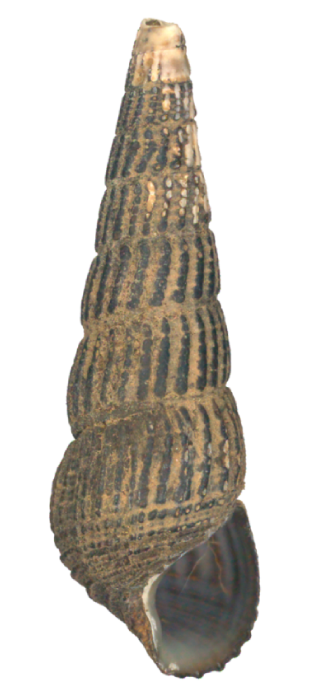
Tylomelania patriarchalis

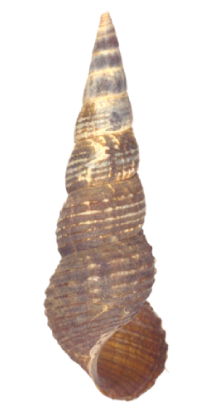
Tylomelania perfecta

Tylomelania sarasinorum

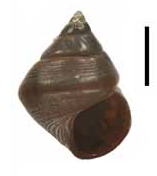
Tylomelania sinabartfeldi

Tylomelania tominangensis

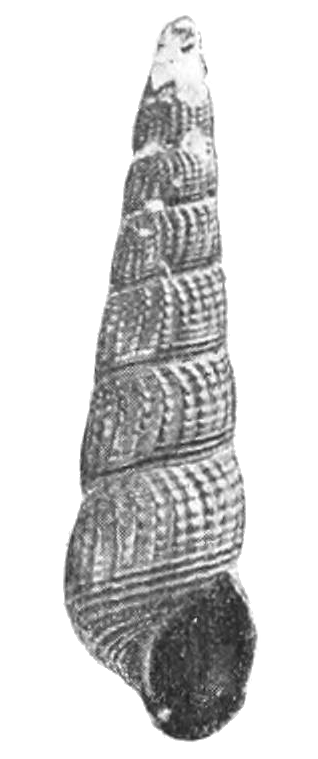
Tylomelania toradjarum

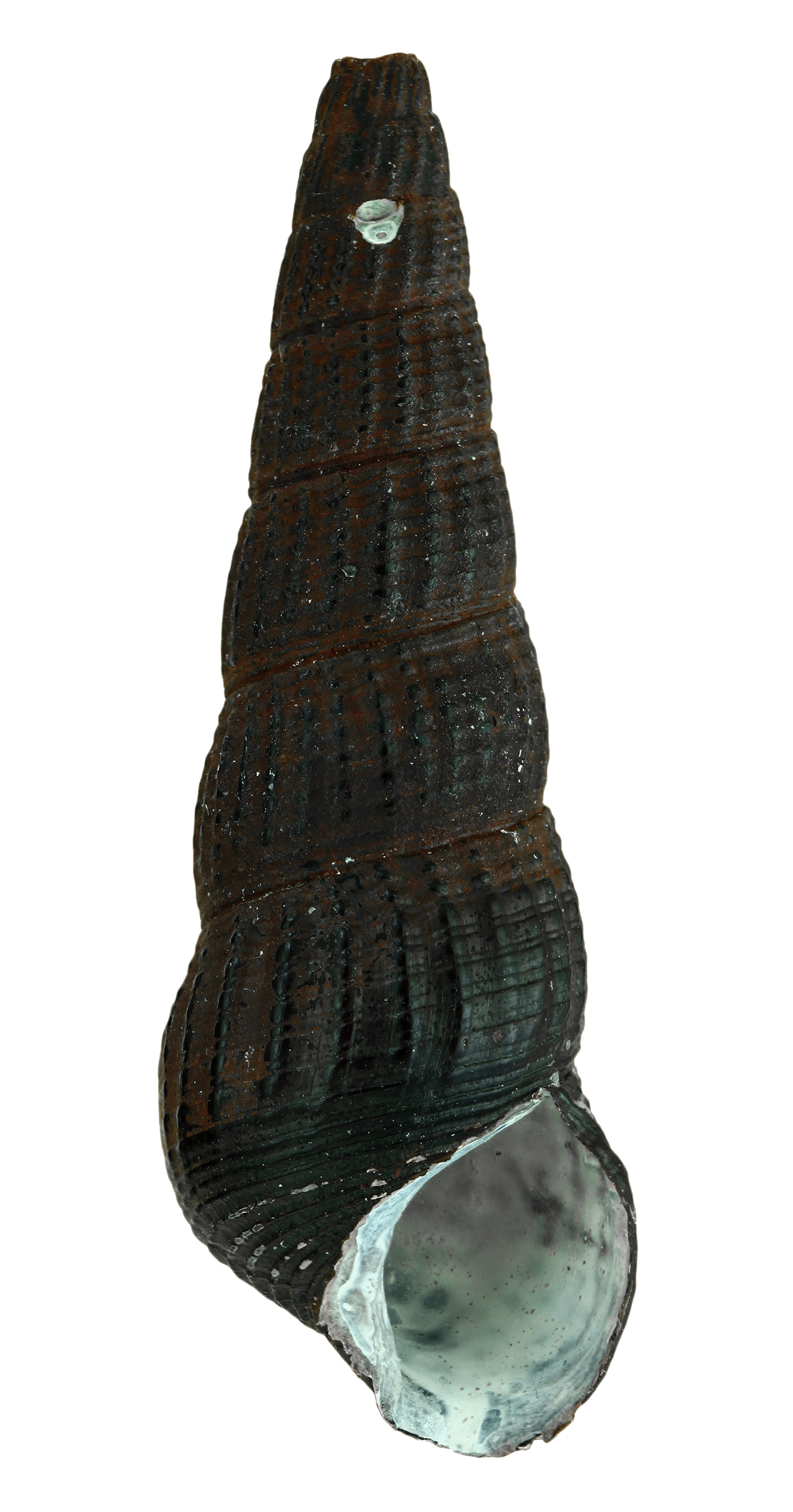
Tylomelania towutensis

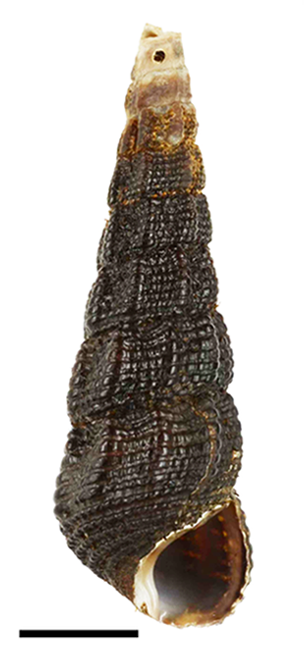
Tylomelania towutica

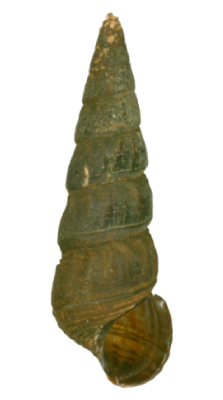
Tylomelania wallacei

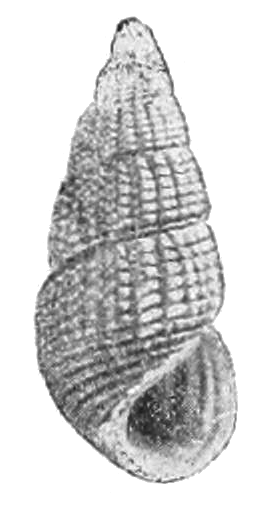
Tylomelania zeamais

== Ecology ==
Species in the genus Tylomelania are ovoviviparous. Newly hatched snails of some species of Tylomelania measure nearly 2 cm (0.79 in) and are the largest newly hatched viviparous gastropods.

== Aquarium Hobby ==
Tylomelania species are sold in the freshwater aquarium trade under the common name "rabbit snails." They are kept for their ornamental appearance and slow, manageable reproduction rate. Unlike most freshwater aquarium snails, Tylomelania requires warm, alkaline water (pH 7.3–8.5, 78–84°F) matching their native Lake Poso habitat. They are ovoviviparous, producing single live juveniles rather than egg clutches.

In captivity, rabbit snails require warm water between 76–82°F and a soft substrate. They are livebearers, giving birth to single fully-formed juveniles. Breeding in aquaria is possible when kept in pairs, though the gestation period is slow.
