= Tylomelania sarasinorum =

- An apertural view of a shell of Tylomelania sarasinorum.

Conservation status
- Endangered (IUCN 3.1)

Scientific classification
- Kingdom: Animalia
- Phylum: Mollusca
- Class: Gastropoda
- Subclass: Caenogastropoda
- Family: Pachychilidae
- Genus: Tylomelania
- Species: T. sarasinorum

Binomial name
- Tylomelania sarasinorum (Kruimel, 1913)

Synonyms
- Melania sarasinorum Kruimel, 1913

Species of gastropod

Tylomelania sarasinorum is a species of freshwater snail with an operculum, an aquatic gastropod mollusk in the family Pachychilidae.

The specific name sarasinorum is in honor of Swiss naturalists Paul Sarasin and Fritz Sarasin, who described 20 Tylomelania species from Sulawesi.

== Distribution ==
This species occurs in Malili Lakes, Sulawesi, Indonesia. Its type locality is lake Towuti, Loeha Island.

== Ecology ==
Tylomelania sarasinorum is a lacustrine species.

The females of Tylomelania sarasinorum usually have 1-14 embryos in their brood pouch. Newly hatched snails of Tylomelania sarasinorum have a shell height of 0.5-8.5 mm.
