= Tylomelania palicolarum =

Scientific classification
- Domain: Eukaryota
- Kingdom: Animalia
- Phylum: Mollusca
- Class: Gastropoda
- Subclass: Caenogastropoda
- Family: Pachychilidae
- Genus: Tylomelania
- Species: T. palicolarum

Binomial name
- Tylomelania palicolarum (Sarasin & Sarasin, 1897)

Synonyms
- Melania palicolarum Sarasin & Sarasin, 1897

Species of gastropod

Tylomelania palicolarum is a species of freshwater snail with an operculum, an aquatic gastropod mollusk in the family Pachychilidae.

The specific name palicolarum is according to the Latin words "pile" that means "pile" and Latin word "colus". The specific name refer to stilt houses that were built around the lake.

== Distribution ==
This species occurs in Malili lakes, Sulawesi, Indonesia. It occur in the single lake and the type locality is the lake Towuti.

== Description ==
The shell has 6-8 whorls.

The width of the shell is 25 mm. The height of the shell is 73 mm. The width of the aperture is 13.5 mm. The height of the aperture is 23 mm.

There are 6-7 concentric lines on the operculum.
