= Tylomelania insulaesacrae =

Scientific classification
- Domain: Eukaryota
- Kingdom: Animalia
- Phylum: Mollusca
- Class: Gastropoda
- Subclass: Caenogastropoda
- Family: Pachychilidae
- Genus: Tylomelania
- Species: T. insulaesacrae

Binomial name
- Tylomelania insulaesacrae (Sarasin & Sarasin, 1897)

Synonyms
- Melania insulae sacrae Sarasin & Sarasin, 1897

Species of gastropod

Tylomelania insulaesacrae is a species of freshwater snail with an operculum, an aquatic gastropod mollusk in the family Pachychilidae.

== Distribution ==
This species occurs in Malili lakes, Sulawesi, Indonesia. It occur in the single lake and the type locality is the lake Towuti.

== Description ==
The width of the shell is 8 mm. The height of the shell is 16 mm. The width of the aperture is 4 mm. The height of the aperture is 7.5 mm.
