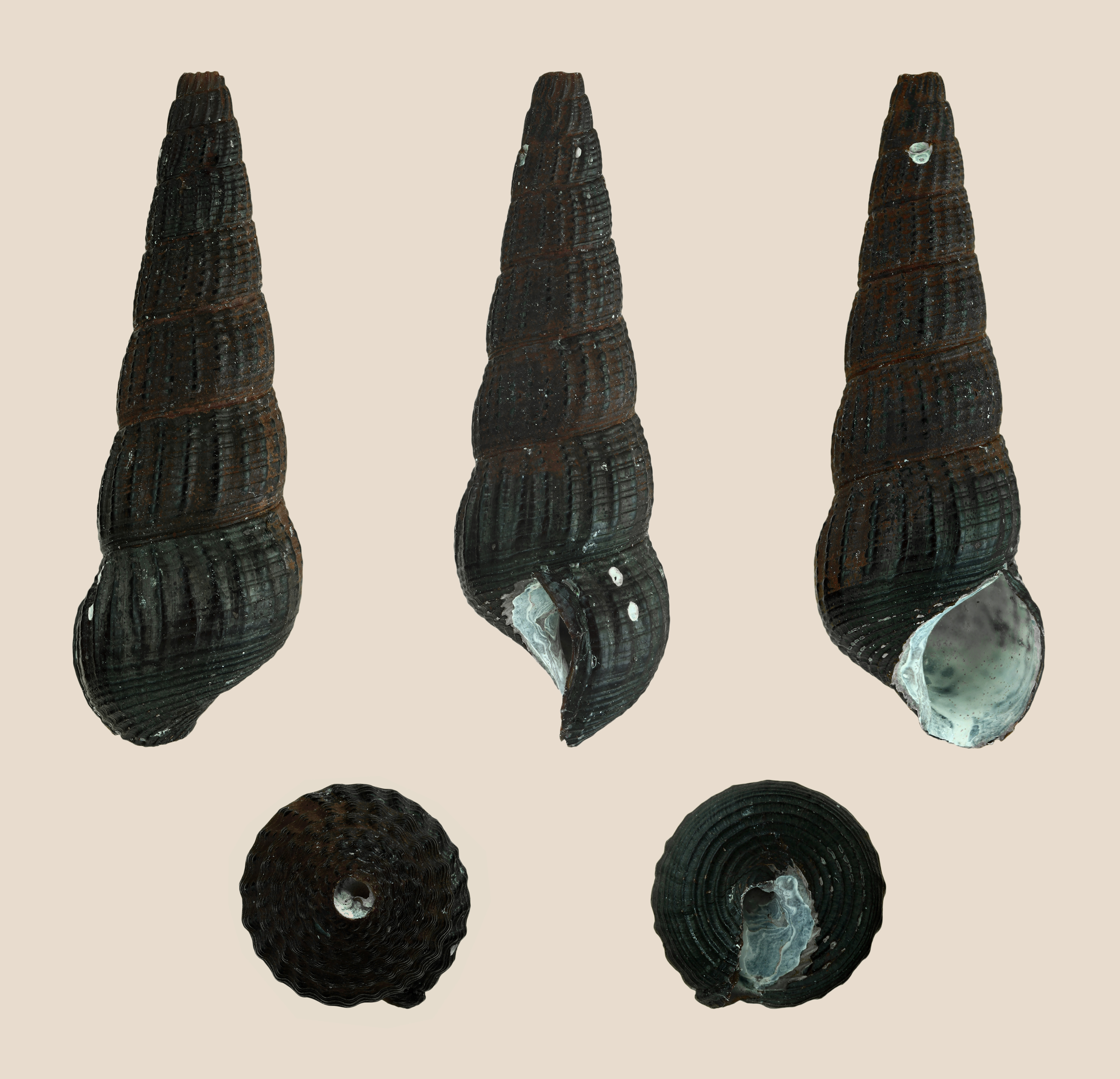

Scientific classification
- Domain: Eukaryota
- Kingdom: Animalia
- Phylum: Mollusca
- Class: Gastropoda
- Subclass: Caenogastropoda
- Family: Pachychilidae
- Genus: Tylomelania
- Species: T. towutensis

Binomial name
- Tylomelania towutensis (Sarasin & Sarasin, 1897)

Synonyms
- Melania toradjarum var. towutensis Sarasin & Sarasin, 1897

= Tylomelania towutensis =

Species of gastropod

Tylomelania towutensis is a species of freshwater snail with an operculum, an aquatic gastropod mollusk in the family Pachychilidae.

The specific name towutensis is according to the lake Towuti.

== Distribution ==
This species occurs in Malili lakes, Sulawesi, Indonesia. It occur in the single lake and the type locality is the lake Towuti.

== Description ==
The shell has 6-9 whorls.

The width of the shell is 20 mm. The height of the shell is 62 mm. The width of the aperture is 12 mm. The height of the aperture is 20 mm.

There are 6-7 concentric lines on the operculum.
