= Tylomelania carbo =

Scientific classification
- Domain: Eukaryota
- Kingdom: Animalia
- Phylum: Mollusca
- Class: Gastropoda
- Subclass: Caenogastropoda
- Family: Pachychilidae
- Genus: Tylomelania
- Species: T. carbo

Binomial name
- Tylomelania carbo Sarasin & Sarasin, 1897

Species of gastropod

Tylomelania carbo is a species of freshwater snail with an operculum, an aquatic gastropod mollusk in the family Pachychilidae.

The sister group (the closest relative) of Tylomelania carbo is Tylomelania toradjarum.

== Distribution ==
This species occurs in lake Poso, Central Sulawesi, Indonesia. The type locality is lake Poso.

== Description ==
The shell has 4-5 whorls.

The width of the shell is up to 10.5 mm. The height of the shell is up to 16.5 mm. The width of the aperture is 6 mm. The height of the aperture is 9 mm.

The length of the radula can be up to 21.5 mm.
