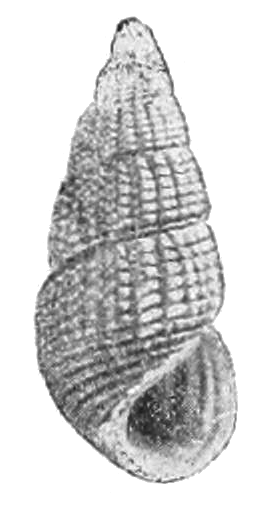
- Apertural view of a shell of Tylomelania zeamais

Scientific classification
- Kingdom: Animalia
- Phylum: Mollusca
- Class: Gastropoda
- Subclass: Caenogastropoda
- Order: incertae sedis
- Family: Pachychilidae
- Genus: Tylomelania
- Species: T. zeamais

Binomial name
- Tylomelania zeamais (Sarasin & Sarasin, 1897)

Synonyms
- Melania zea mays Sarasin & Sarasin, 1897

= Tylomelania zeamais =

Species of gastropod

Tylomelania zeamais is a species of freshwater snail with an operculum, an aquatic gastropod mollusk in the family Pachychilidae.

== Distribution ==
This species occurs in Malili lakes, Sulawesi, Indonesia. It occur in the single lake and the type locality is the Lake Matano.

== Description ==
The shell has 7-8 whorls.

The width of the shell is 13 mm. The height of the shell is 29 mm. The width of the aperture is 7.5 mm. The height of the aperture is 11.5 mm.

There are 6 concentric lines on the operculum.
