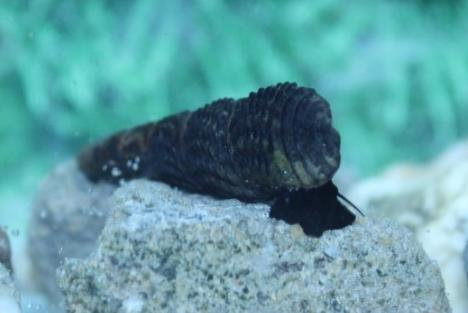

Scientific classification
- Domain: Eukaryota
- Kingdom: Animalia
- Phylum: Mollusca
- Class: Gastropoda
- Subclass: Caenogastropoda
- Family: Pachychilidae
- Genus: Tylomelania
- Species: T. scalariopsis

Binomial name
- Tylomelania scalariopsis (Sarasin & Sarasin, 1897)

Synonyms
- Melania scalariopsis Sarasin & Sarasin, 1897

= Tylomelania scalariopsis =

Species of gastropod

Tylomelania scalariopsis is a species of freshwater snail with an operculum, an aquatic gastropod mollusk in the family Pachychilidae.

== Distribution ==
This species occurs in Lake Poso drainage, Sulawesi, Indonesia. The type locality is the Poso River, 400 m against the river current.

== Description ==
The shell has 11-12 whorls.

The width of the shell is 12 mm. The height of the shell is 34 mm. The width of the aperture is 6.5 mm. The height of the aperture is 10 mm.

There are 6 concentric lines on the operculum.
