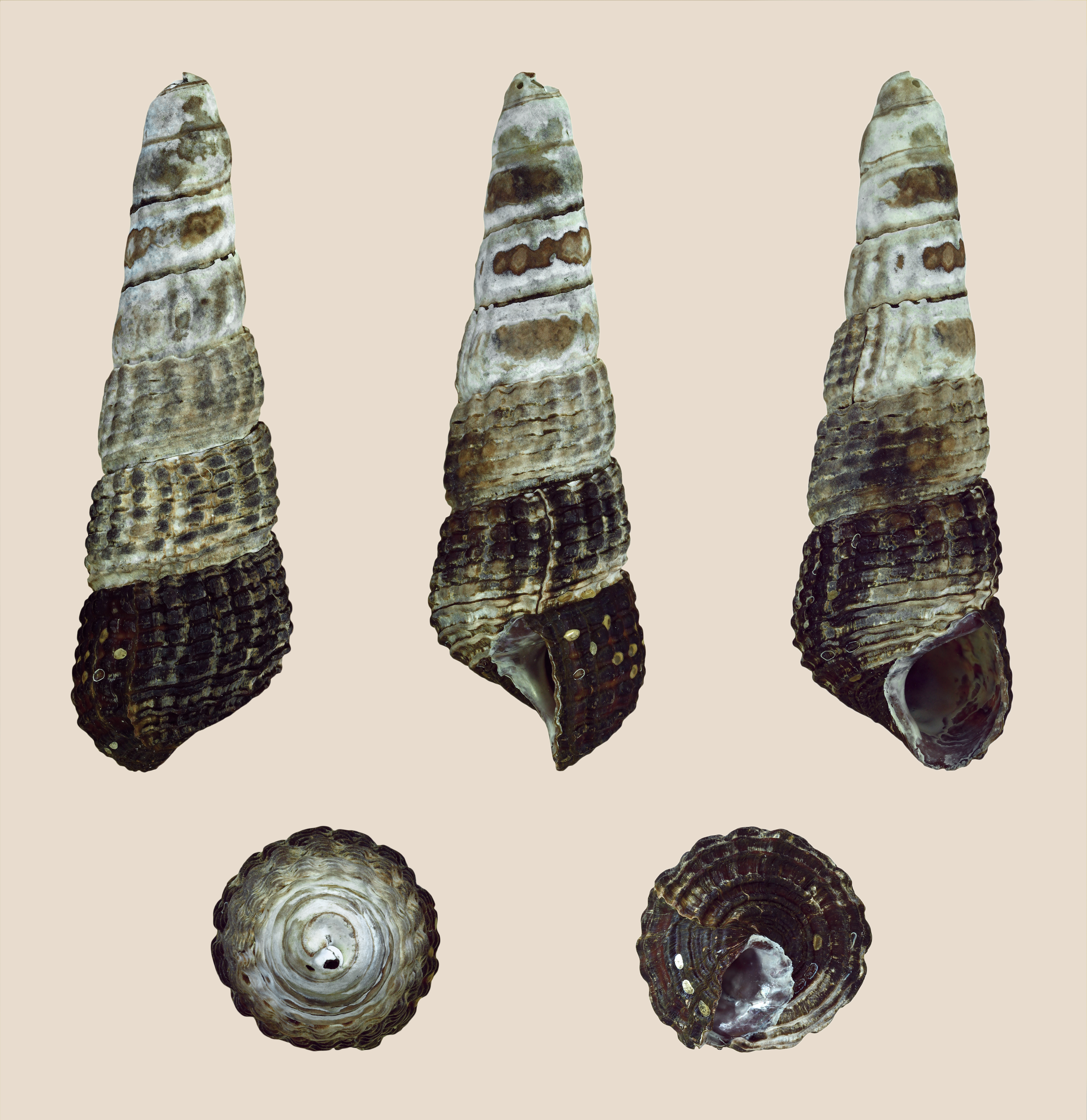
- A shell of Tylomelania patriarchalis

Scientific classification
- Domain: Eukaryota
- Kingdom: Animalia
- Phylum: Mollusca
- Class: Gastropoda
- Subclass: Caenogastropoda
- Family: Pachychilidae
- Genus: Tylomelania
- Species: T. patriarchalis

Binomial name
- Tylomelania patriarchalis (Sarasin & Sarasin, 1897)

Synonyms
- Melania patriarchalis Sarasin & Sarasin, 1897

= Tylomelania patriarchalis =

Species of gastropod

Tylomelania patriarchalis is a species of freshwater snail with an operculum, an aquatic gastropod mollusk in the family Pachychilidae.

== Distribution ==
This species occurs in Malili lakes, Sulawesi, Indonesia. It occur in the single lake and the type locality is the lake Matano.

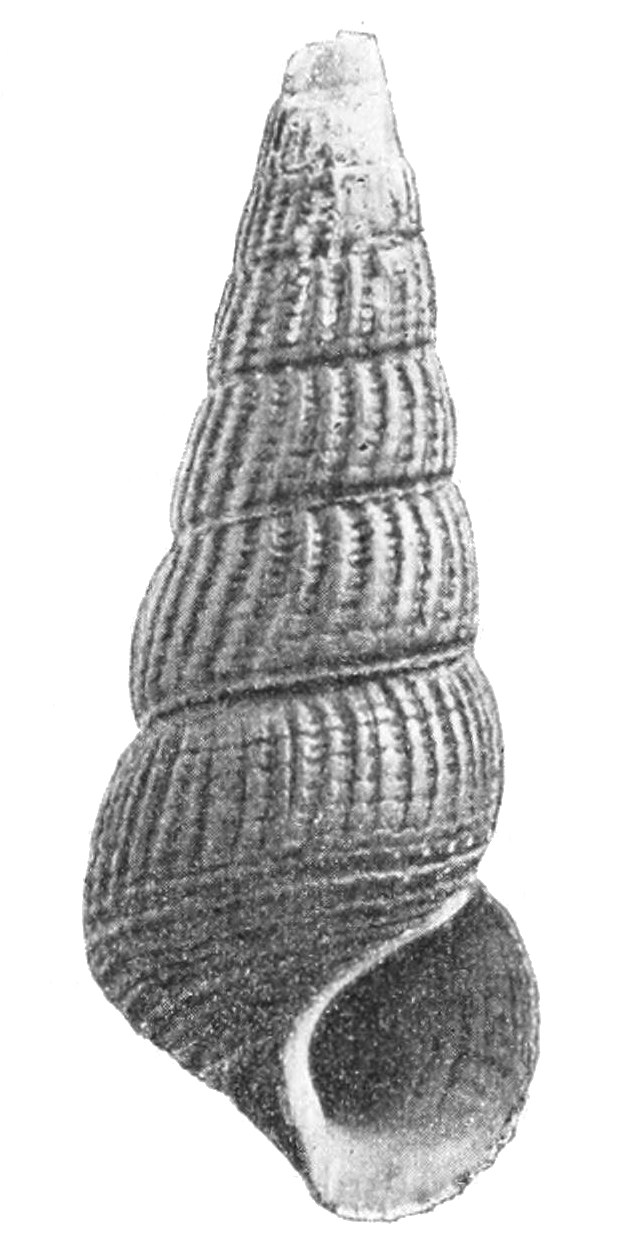
Apertural view of a shell of Tylomelania patriarchalis from its type description.

== Description ==
The shell has 6-9 whorls.

The width of the shell is 26 mm. The height of the shell is 82 mm. The width of the aperture is 14 mm. The height of the aperture is 22 mm.

There are 6-7 concentric lines on the operculum.
