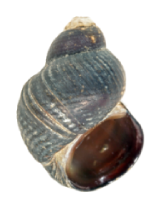
- Apertural view of a shell of Tylomelania neritiformis

Scientific classification
- Domain: Eukaryota
- Kingdom: Animalia
- Phylum: Mollusca
- Class: Gastropoda
- Subclass: Caenogastropoda
- Family: Pachychilidae
- Genus: Tylomelania
- Species: T. neritiformis

Binomial name
- Tylomelania neritiformis Sarasin & Sarasin, 1897

Synonyms
- Melania neritiformis Brotia neritiformis

= Tylomelania neritiformis =

Species of gastropod

Tylomelania neritiformis is a species of freshwater snail with an operculum, an aquatic gastropod mollusk in the family Pachychilidae.

Tylomelania neritiformis is the type species of the genus Tylomelania. This type species was subsequently designated by Johannes Thiele in 1929.

== Distribution ==
The type locality is the upper part of the Poso River in Sulawesi, Indonesia.

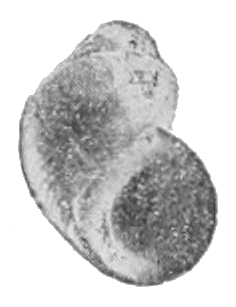
Apertural view of a shell of Tylomelania neritiformis from its type description.

== Description ==
The shell is small and thick, with a short spire and five whorls. It is black in color with a violet tint.
