= Tylomelania gemmifera =

Scientific classification
- Domain: Eukaryota
- Kingdom: Animalia
- Phylum: Mollusca
- Class: Gastropoda
- Subclass: Caenogastropoda
- Family: Pachychilidae
- Genus: Tylomelania
- Species: T. gemmifera

Binomial name
- Tylomelania gemmifera (Sarasin & Sarasin, 1897)

Synonyms
- Melania gemmifera Sarasin & Sarasin, 1897

Species of gastropod

Tylomelania gemmifera is a species of freshwater snail with an operculum, an aquatic gastropod mollusk in the family Pachychilidae.

== Distribution ==
This species occurs in Malili lakes, Sulawesi, Indonesia. It occurs in one lake; the type locality is Lake Matano.

== Description ==
The shell has 9-10 whorls.

The width of the shell is 13.5 millimetres (0.53 in). The height of the shell is 46.5 millimetres (1.83 in). The width of the aperture is 8 millimetres (0.31 in). The height of the aperture is 10.5 millimetres (0.41 in).
