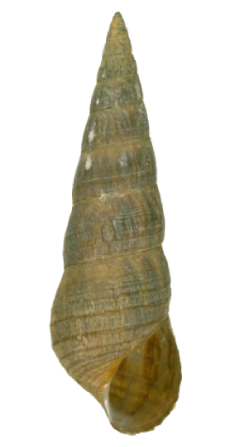
- An apertural view of a shell of Tylomelania carota.

Scientific classification
- Domain: Eukaryota
- Kingdom: Animalia
- Phylum: Mollusca
- Class: Gastropoda
- Subclass: Caenogastropoda
- Family: Pachychilidae
- Genus: Tylomelania
- Species: T. carota

Binomial name
- Tylomelania carota (Sarasin & Sarasin, 1898)

Synonyms
- Melania carota Sarasin & Sarasin, 1898

= Tylomelania carota =

Species of gastropod

Tylomelania carota is a species of freshwater snail with an operculum, an aquatic gastropod mollusk in the family Pachychilidae.

== Distribution ==
This species occurs in the Kalaena River drainage, Sulawesi, Indonesia.

== Ecology ==
Tylomelania carota is a riverine species.
