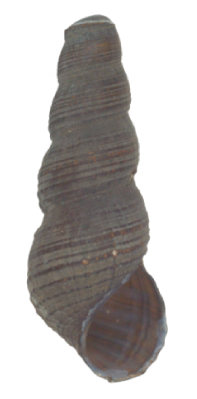
- An apertural view of a shell of Tylomelania celebicola.

Scientific classification
- Domain: Eukaryota
- Kingdom: Animalia
- Phylum: Mollusca
- Class: Gastropoda
- Subclass: Caenogastropoda
- Family: Pachychilidae
- Genus: Tylomelania
- Species: T. celebicola

Binomial name
- Tylomelania celebicola (Sarasin & Sarasin, 1898)

Synonyms
- Melania asperata var. celebicola Sarasin & Sarasin, 1898; Brotia asperata celebicola (Sarasin & Sarasin, 1898)

= Tylomelania celebicola =

Species of gastropod

Tylomelania celebicola is a species of freshwater snail with an operculum, an aquatic gastropod mollusk in the family Pachychilidae.

This species was originally described as a subspecies. The specific name celebicola is derived from the Celebes, a former name of Sulawesi, where this species occurs.

== Distribution ==
This species occurs in central Sulawesi, Indonesia.

== Ecology ==
Tylomelania celebicola is a riverine species.
