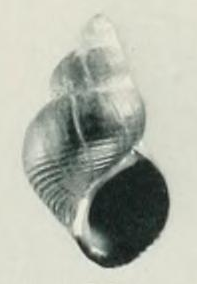
- An apertural view of a shell of Tylomelania connectens.

Scientific classification
- Domain: Eukaryota
- Kingdom: Animalia
- Phylum: Mollusca
- Class: Gastropoda
- Subclass: Caenogastropoda
- Family: Pachychilidae
- Genus: Tylomelania
- Species: T. connectens

Binomial name
- Tylomelania connectens Sarasin & Sarasin, 1898

Synonyms
- Tylomelania porcellanica var. connectens Sarasin & Sarasin, 1898

= Tylomelania connectens =

Species of gastropod

Tylomelania connectens is a species of freshwater snail with an operculum, an aquatic gastropod mollusk in the family Pachychilidae.

This species was originally described as a subspecies.

== Distribution ==
This species occurs in Poso River, Sulawesi, Indonesia.

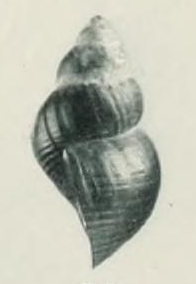
Lateral view of a shell of Tylomelania connectens.

== Ecology ==
Tylomelania connectens is a riverine species.
