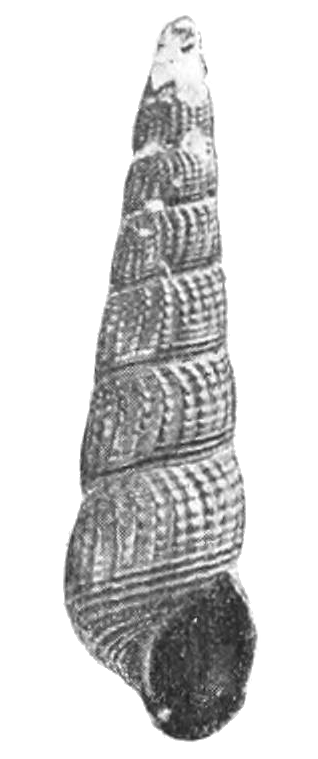
- Apertural view of a shell of Tylomelania toradjarum

Scientific classification
- Domain: Eukaryota
- Kingdom: Animalia
- Phylum: Mollusca
- Class: Gastropoda
- Subclass: Caenogastropoda
- Family: Pachychilidae
- Genus: Tylomelania
- Species: T. toradjarum

Binomial name
- Tylomelania toradjarum (Sarasin & Sarasin, 1897)

Synonyms
- Melania toradjarum Sarasin & Sarasin, 1897

= Tylomelania toradjarum =

Species of gastropod

Tylomelania toradjarum is a species of freshwater snail with an operculum, an aquatic gastropod mollusk in the family Pachychilidae.

The specific name toradjarum is in honor of Toraja (spelling variant Toradja), an ethnic group indigenous to Sulawesi.

== Distribution ==
This species is endemic to Lake Poso, Sulawesi, Indonesia. The type locality is the Lake Poso.

== Description ==
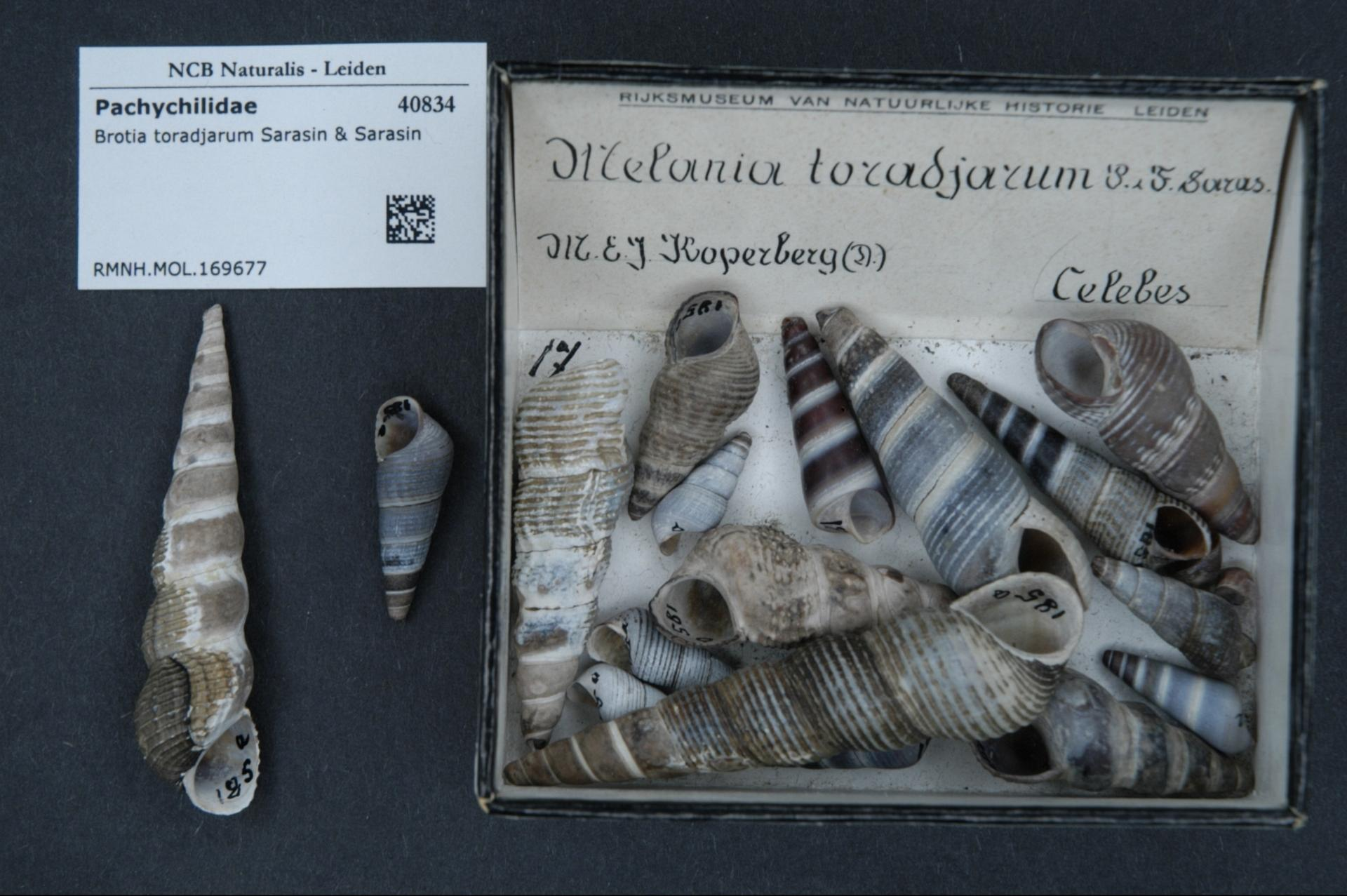
Tylomelania toradjarum shells.

The shell has 7-9 whorls.

The width of the shell is 16 mm. The height of the shell is 54 mm. The width of the aperture is 10 mm. The height of the aperture is 15 mm.

There are 9 concentric lines on the operculum.
