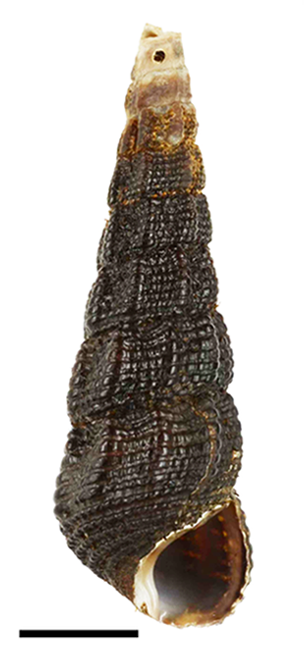
- An apertural view of a shell of Tylomelania towutica. Scale bar is 10 mm.

Scientific classification
- Domain: Eukaryota
- Kingdom: Animalia
- Phylum: Mollusca
- Class: Gastropoda
- Subclass: Caenogastropoda
- Family: Pachychilidae
- Genus: Tylomelania
- Species: T. towutica

Binomial name
- Tylomelania towutica (Kruimel, 1913)

Synonyms
- Melania towutica Kruimel, 1913

= Tylomelania towutica =

Species of gastropod

Tylomelania towutica is a species of freshwater snail with an operculum, an aquatic gastropod mollusk in the family Pachychilidae.

The specific name towutica is after Lake Towuti where it lives.

== Distribution ==
This species occurs in Lake Towuti and in the Tominanga River, in south Sulawesi, Indonesia. Its type locality is lake Towuti, Loeha Island.

== Description ==
An apertural view of a shell of Tylomelania towutica from its type description.

== Ecology ==
Tylomelania towutica is a lacustrine species.

The females of Tylomelania towutica usually have 1-7 embryos in their brood pouch. Newly hatched snails of Tylomelania towutica have a shell height of 0.5-9.3 mm.

== Human use ==
It is a part of ornamental pet trade for freshwater aquaria.
