= Tylomelania tominangensis =

- An apertural view of a shell of Tylomelania tominangensis.

Scientific classification
- Domain: Eukaryota
- Kingdom: Animalia
- Phylum: Mollusca
- Class: Gastropoda
- Subclass: Caenogastropoda
- Family: Pachychilidae
- Genus: Tylomelania
- Species: T. tominangensis

Binomial name
- Tylomelania tominangensis (Kruimel, 1913)

Synonyms
- Melania tominangensis Kruimel, 1913

Species of gastropod

Tylomelania tominangensis is a species of freshwater snail with an operculum, an aquatic gastropod mollusk in the family Pachychilidae.

The specific name tominangensis is named after the Tominanga River, where it lives.

== Distribution ==
This species occurs in the Tominanga River and in Lake Lontoa, south Sulawesi, Indonesia. Its type locality is the Tominanga River near lake Towuti.

== Ecology ==
The females of Tylomelania tominangensis usually have 1-4 embryos in their brood pouch. Newly hatched snails of Tylomelania tominangensis have a shell height of 6.8-8.5 mm.
