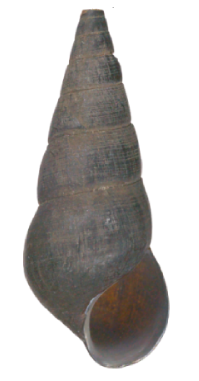
- An apertural view of a shell of Tylomelania helmuti.

Scientific classification
- Kingdom: Animalia
- Phylum: Mollusca
- Class: Gastropoda
- Subclass: Caenogastropoda
- Order: incertae sedis
- Family: Pachychilidae
- Genus: Tylomelania
- Species: T. helmuti

Binomial name
- Tylomelania helmuti von Rintelen & Glaubrecht, 2003

= Tylomelania helmuti =

Species of gastropod

Tylomelania helmuti is a species of freshwater snail with an operculum, an aquatic gastropod mollusk in the family Pachychilidae.

The specific name helmuti is in honor of Helmut Glaubrecht, father of the second author and supporter of the malacological research.

== Distribution ==
This species occurs in the Lake Towuti drainage, in Sulawesi, Indonesia. The type locality is the stream-crossing on the road from Wawondula to Timampu.

== Description ==
The shell has always some whorls corroded with 3-8 whorls.

The width of the shell is up to 8.0–16.3 mm. The height of the shell is up to 15.8–34.6 mm. The width of the aperture is 4.0–8.5 mm. The height of the aperture is 6.2–13.2 mm.

== Ecology ==
This species lives in shallow streams and marshes.
