= Nessia sarasinorum =

Conservation status
- Vulnerable (IUCN 3.1)

Scientific classification
- Kingdom: Animalia
- Phylum: Chordata
- Class: Reptilia
- Order: Squamata
- Family: Scincidae
- Genus: Nessia
- Species: N. sarasinorum

Binomial name
- Nessia sarasinorum (F. Müller, 1889)

Synonyms
- Acontias sarasinorum F. Müller, 1889; Nessia sarasinorum — Deraniyagala, 1931

Species of lizard

Nessia sarasinorum, commonly known as Sarasins's snake skink, Müller's nessia, and Muller's [sic] nessia, is a species of lizard in the subfamily Scincinae of the family Scincidae. The species is endemic to the island of Sri Lanka.

== Etymology ==
The specific name, sarasinorum, is in honor of Swiss zoologists Karl Friedrich Sarasin and Paul Benedict Sarasin, who were cousins.

== Geographic distribution ==
A dry zone skink, Nessia sarasinorum is known in Sri Lanka from Maha Oya, Lahugala Kitulana National Park, Polgahawela, Polonnaruwa, Galigamuwa, Buttala, Inamaluwa, Dambulla, Kandalama, and Batticaloa.

== Description ==
The body of Nessia sarasinorum is slender and of equal girth, from head to tail. The snout is acute and short. The fronto-nasal is shorter and broader than the frontal. The lower eyelid is scaly. The midbody scale rows number 22. The pre-anals are distinctly enlarged. The anterior limbs missing, and each posterior limb is reduced to a bud. The dorsum is light brown or bluish gray. There are individual scales with darker patches. Ventrally, it is lighter.

== Behavior ==
Nessia sarasinorum is terrestrial and fossorial.

== Habitat ==
The preferred natural habitat of Nessia sarasinorum is forest, at elevations of 100–500 m (330–1,640 ft), where it burrows in loose soil beneath plant litter and around tree roots. It is also occasionally found in home gardens.
