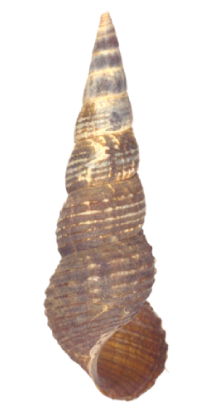
- Photo of an apertural view of a shell of Tylomelania perfecta.

Scientific classification
- Kingdom: Animalia
- Phylum: Mollusca
- Class: Gastropoda
- Subclass: Caenogastropoda
- Order: incertae sedis
- Family: Pachychilidae
- Genus: Tylomelania
- Species: T. perfecta

Binomial name
- Tylomelania perfecta (Mousson, 1849)

Synonyms
- Melania perfecta Mousson, 1849

= Tylomelania perfecta =

Species of gastropod

Tylomelania perfecta is a species of freshwater snail with an operculum, an aquatic gastropod mollusk in the family Pachychilidae. Tylomelania perfecta, like other members of its genus, is ovoviviparous, meaning it retains fertilized eggs in a brood pouch inside the female’s pallial oviduct until they hatch into fully formed juveniles. This unique reproductive strategy is uncommon among freshwater snails and involves significant maternal investment (von Rintelen & Glaubrecht, 2005). This is the first species of the genus Tylomelania that was described (under the name Melania perfecta) by malacologist Albert Mousson in 1849.

== Distribution ==
This species occurs in south, south-east and central Sulawesi, Indonesia. It is a widespread species of Tylomelania.

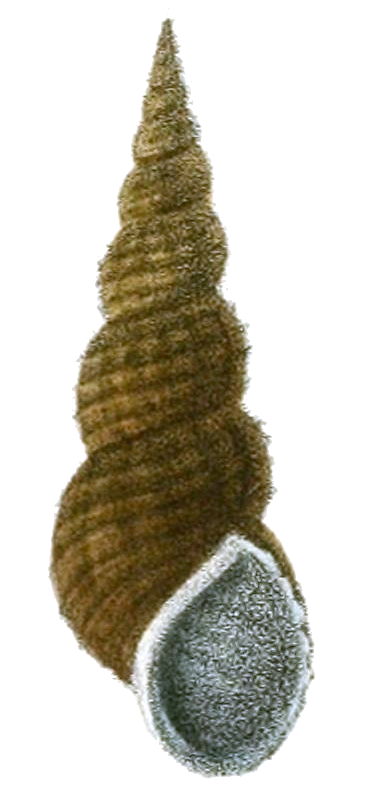
Drawing of an apertural view of a shell of Tylomelania perfecta.

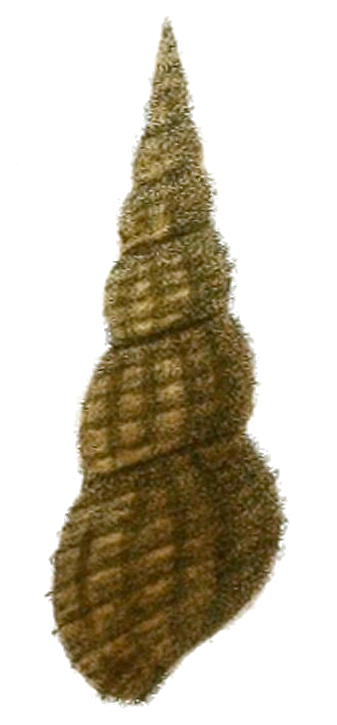
Drawing of an abapertural view of a shell of Tylomelania perfecta.

== Ecology ==
This is a riverine species.
