= Intha umbilicalis =

Conservation status
- Least Concern (IUCN 3.1)

Scientific classification
- Kingdom: Animalia
- Phylum: Mollusca
- Class: Gastropoda
- Superorder: Hygrophila
- Family: Planorbidae
- Genus: Intha
- Species: I. umbilicalis

Binomial name
- Intha umbilicalis (Benson, 1836)
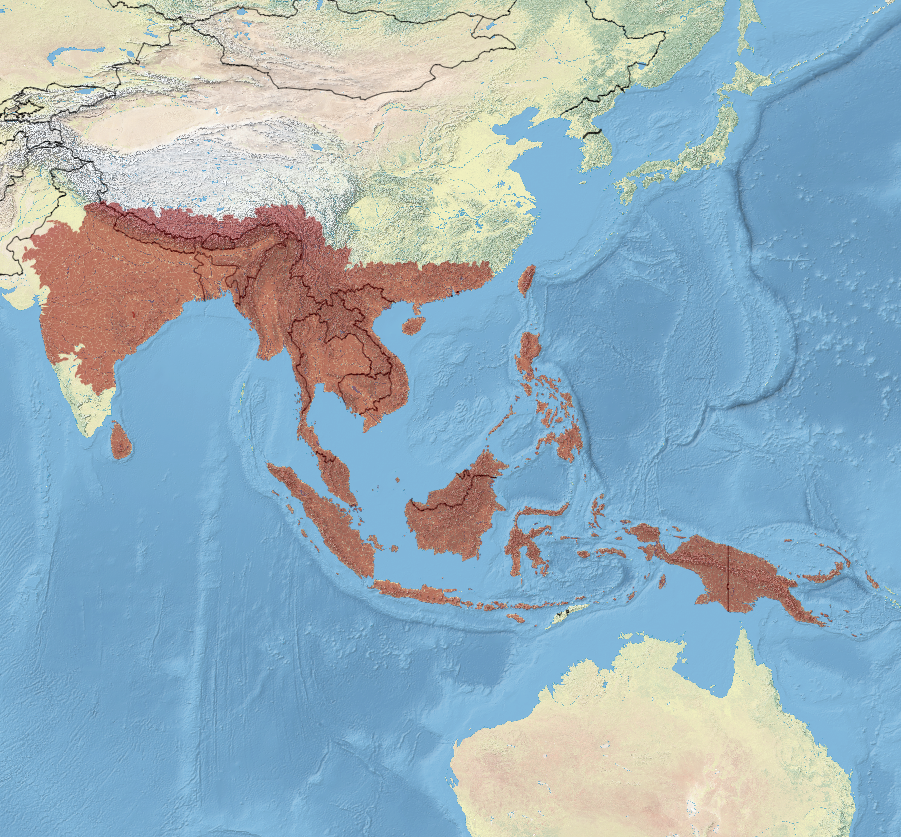
- Distribution map of Intha umbilicalis

Synonyms
- Planorbis umbilicalis Benson, 1836; Hippeutis umbilicalis (Benson, 1836); Segmentina umbilicalis Germain, 1923

Species of gastropod

Intha umbilicalis is a species of air-breathing freshwater snail, an aquatic pulmonate gastropod in the ram's horn snail family, Planorbidae.

== Distribution ==
This species is found in:

- Sri Lanka
- India (Andhra Pradesh, Assam, Bihar, Delhi, Jammu-Kashmir, Madhya Pradesh, Maharashtra, Manipur, Orissa, Rajasthan, Uttaranchal, Uttar Pradesh, West Bengal)
- Nepal
- Bangladesh
- China
- Taiwan
- Myanmar
- Cambodia
- Laos
- Thailand
- Vietnam
- Malaysia
- Indonesia
- Philippines
- Papua New Guinea

== Ecology ==
Parasites of Intha umbilicalis include:

- Fasciolopsis buski
- Paragonimus westermani
- Gastrodiscoides hominis
- Cercaria helicorbisi
