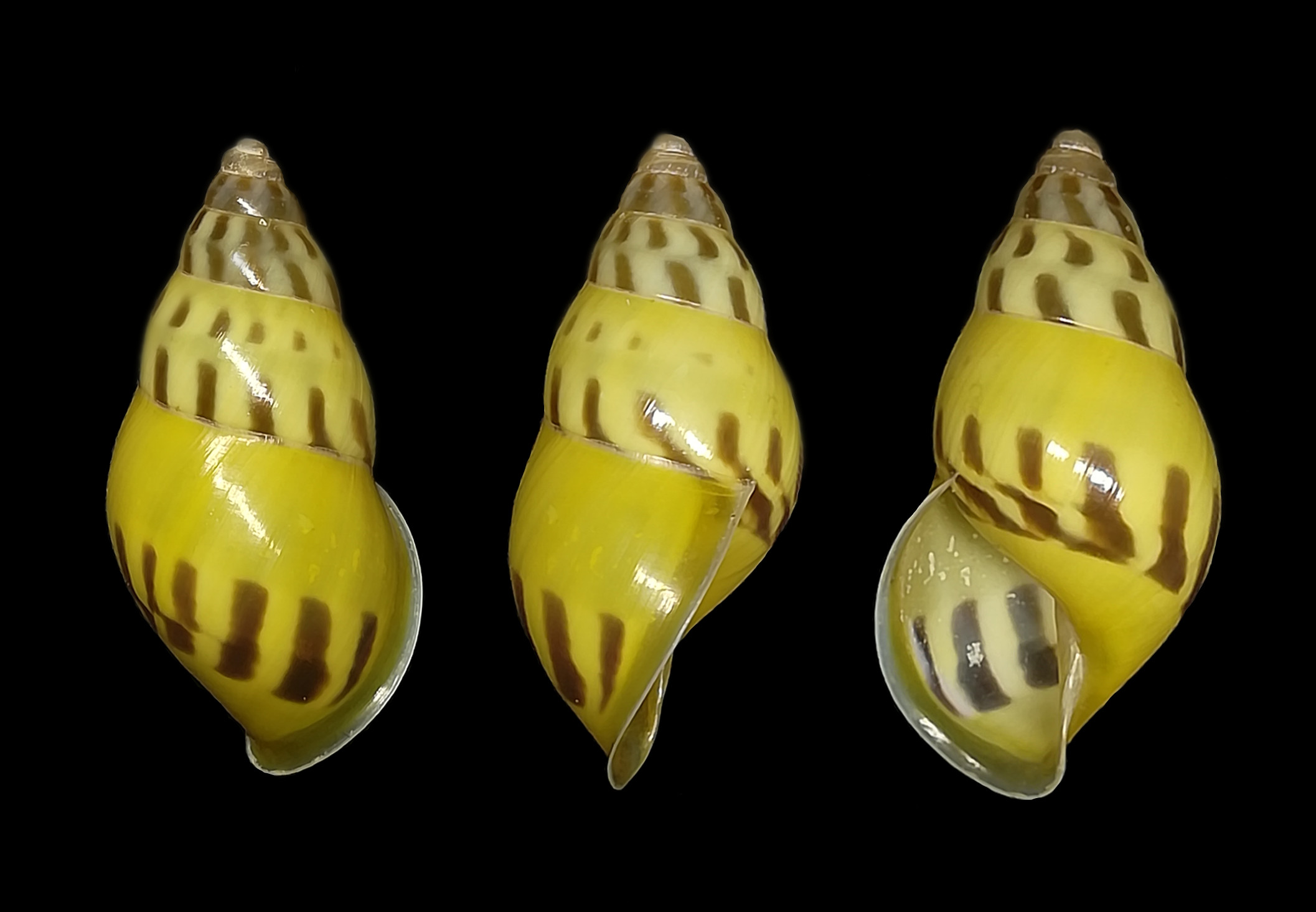

Scientific classification
- Kingdom: Animalia
- Phylum: Mollusca
- Class: Gastropoda
- Order: Stylommatophora
- Family: Camaenidae
- Genus: Amphidromus
- Species: A. elvinae

Binomial name
- Amphidromus elvinae Dharma, 2007

Synonyms
- Amphidromus (Syndromus) elvinae Dharma, 2007 · alternative representation

= Amphidromus elvinae =

Species of snail in the family Camaenidae

Amphidromus elvinae is a species of air-breathing land snail in the family Camaenidae.

== Distribution ==
This species is found in South Bengkulu, South of Sumatra Island, Indonesia.
