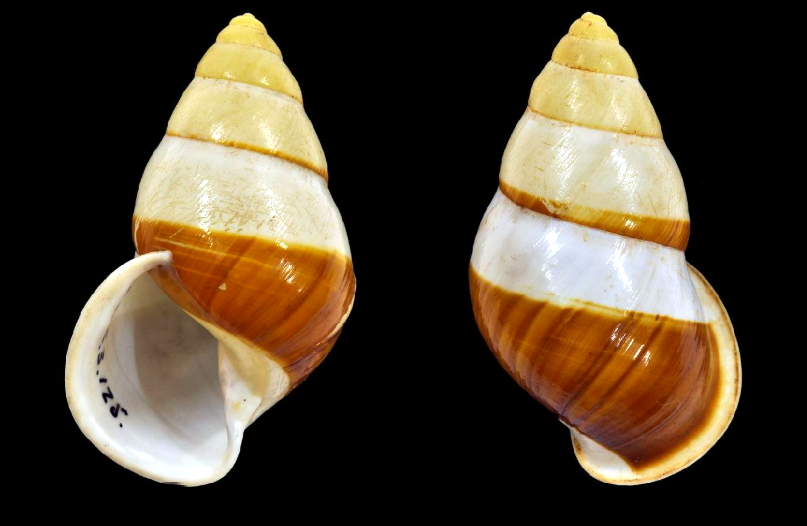
- Shell of Amphidromus webbi webbi (holotype at the Natural History Museum, London)

Scientific classification
- Kingdom: Animalia
- Phylum: Mollusca
- Class: Gastropoda
- Order: Stylommatophora
- Family: Camaenidae
- Genus: Amphidromus
- Species: A. webbi

Binomial name
- Amphidromus webbi Fulton, 1907

= Amphidromus webbi =

Species of gastropod

Amphidromus webbi is a species of air-breathing tree snail, an arboreal gastropod mollusk in the family Camaenidae.

Subspecies

- Amphidromus webbi babiensis Laidlaw, 1954
- Amphidromus webbi simalurensis Laidlaw, 1954
- Amphidromus webbi webbi Fulton, 1907

== Description ==
Amphidromus webbi is large, with a shell length ranging from 51 mm (2.0 in) and a diameter of 31 mm (1.2 in).

(Original description) The sinistral shell is moderately solid. The early whorls are yellow, fading to cream on later whorls, with a broad, pale chestnut band, approximately 14 mm wide, encircling the body whorl and continuing as a narrow, gradually diminishing band along the suture of the penultimate whorl. The shell contains approximately 6.5 moderately convex whorls, with inconspicuous oblique growth lines. The body whorl ascends slightly at its termination. The aperture is subovate and is white within. The peristome is rather broadly expanded and slightly reflected. The columella isvertical and is expanded above.

== Distribution ==
Amphidromus sowerbyi was found on Sumatra, Indonesia.
