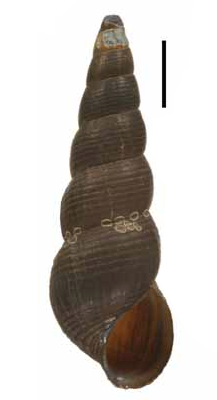
- An apertural view of a shell of a holotype of Tylomelania baskasti

Scientific classification
- Kingdom: Animalia
- Phylum: Mollusca
- Class: Gastropoda
- Subclass: Caenogastropoda
- Family: Pachychilidae
- Genus: Tylomelania
- Species: T. baskasti

Binomial name
- Tylomelania baskasti von Rintelen & Glaubrecht, 2008

= Tylomelania baskasti =

Species of gastropod

Tylomelania baskasti is a species of freshwater snail with an operculum, an aquatic gastropod mollusk in the family Pachychilidae.

The specific name baskasti is in honor of the German author and journalist Bas Kast, who supported the malacological research.

== Distribution ==
This species occurs in the Malili lake system, in Sulawesi, Indonesia. Its type locality is Larona River.

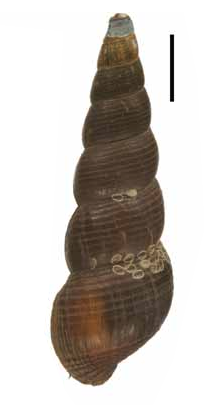
An abapertual view of a holotype of Tylomelania baskasti

== Ecology ==
Newly hatched snails of Tylomelania baskasti have a shell height of 5.7–8.4 mm.
