= Amphidromus elviae =

Scientific classification
- Kingdom: Animalia
- Phylum: Mollusca
- Class: Gastropoda
- Order: Stylommatophora
- Family: Camaenidae
- Genus: Amphidromus
- Species: A. elviae

Binomial name
- Amphidromus elviae Dharma, 2007

Species of gastropod

Amphidromus elviae is a species of air-breathing land snail, a terrestrial pulmonate gastropod mollusc in the family Camaenidae.

== Distribution ==
This species occurs on Sumatra, Indonesia.
