= Amphidromus ameliae =

Scientific classification
- Kingdom: Animalia
- Phylum: Mollusca
- Class: Gastropoda
- Order: Stylommatophora
- Family: Camaenidae
- Genus: Amphidromus
- Species: A. ameliae

Binomial name
- Amphidromus ameliae Dharma, 2007

Species of gastropod

Amphidromus ameliae is a species of air-breathing land snail, a terrestrial pulmonate gastropod mollusc in the family Camaenidae.

== Distribution ==
This species occurs on Sumatra, Indonesia.
