= Tylomelania masapensis =

- An apertural view of a shell of Tylomelania masapensis.

Scientific classification
- Domain: Eukaryota
- Kingdom: Animalia
- Phylum: Mollusca
- Class: Gastropoda
- Subclass: Caenogastropoda
- Family: Pachychilidae
- Genus: Tylomelania
- Species: T. masapensis

Binomial name
- Tylomelania masapensis (Kruimel, 1913)

Synonyms
- Melania masapensis Kruimel, 1913

Species of gastropod

Tylomelania masapensis is a species of freshwater snail with an operculum, an aquatic gastropod mollusk in the family Pachychilidae.

The specific name masapensis is named after Lake Masapi, where it lives.

== Distribution ==
This species occurs in Malili Lakes, Sulawesi, Indonesia. Its type locality is Lake Masapi.

== Ecology ==
Tylomelania masapensis is a lacustrine species.

The females of Tylomelania masapensis usually have 1-5 embryos in their brood pouch. Newly hatched snails of Tylomelania masapensis have a shell height of 0.3-10.0 mm.
