= Tylomelania mahalonensis =

- An apertural view of a shell of Tylomelania mahalonensis.

Scientific classification
- Domain: Eukaryota
- Kingdom: Animalia
- Phylum: Mollusca
- Class: Gastropoda
- Subclass: Caenogastropoda
- Family: Pachychilidae
- Genus: Tylomelania
- Species: T. mahalonensis

Binomial name
- Tylomelania mahalonensis (Kruimel, 1913)

Synonyms
- Melania mahalonensis Kruimel, 1913; Melania mahalonica Kruimel, 1913; Tylomelania mahalonica (Kruimel, 1913)

Species of gastropod

Tylomelania mahalonensis is a species of freshwater snail with an operculum, an aquatic gastropod mollusk in the family Pachychilidae.

The specific name mahalonensis is taken from that of Lake Mahalona, where this species of snail lives.

== Distribution ==
This species occurs in the Malili Lakes, Sulawesi, Indonesia. Its type locality is Lake Mahalona.

== Ecology ==
Tylomelania mahalonensis is a lacustrine species.

The females of Tylomelania mahalonensis usually have 1-11 embryos in their brood pouch. Newly hatched snails of Tylomelania mahalonensis have a shell height of 4.0-10.2 mm.
