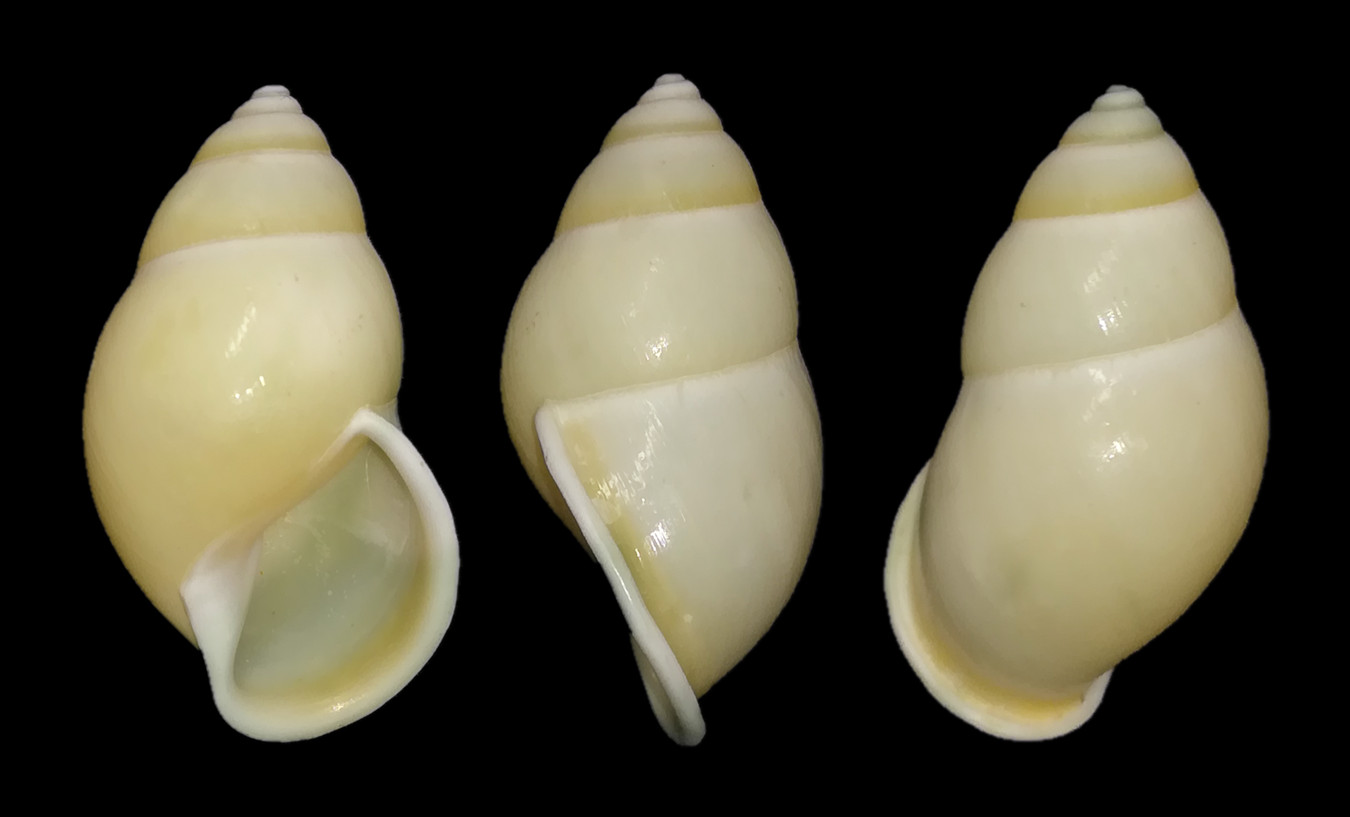
- Shell of Amphidromus djajasasmitai

Scientific classification
- Kingdom: Animalia
- Phylum: Mollusca
- Class: Gastropoda
- Order: Stylommatophora
- Family: Camaenidae
- Genus: Amphidromus
- Species: A. djajasasmitai

Binomial name
- Amphidromus djajasasmitai Dharma, 1993

Synonyms
- Amphidromus (Amphidromus) djajasasmitai Dharma, 1993

= Amphidromus djajasasmitai =

Species of snail

Amphidromus djajasasmitai is a species of air-breathing land snail, a terrestrial pulmonate gastropod mollusc in the family Camaenidae.

== Distribution ==
This species is found in Sumatra, Indonesia.
