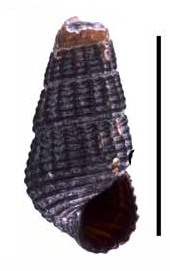
- An apertural view of a shell of a holotype of Tylomelania hannelorae.

Scientific classification
- Domain: Eukaryota
- Kingdom: Animalia
- Phylum: Mollusca
- Class: Gastropoda
- Subclass: Caenogastropoda
- Family: Pachychilidae
- Genus: Tylomelania
- Species: T. hannelorae

Binomial name
- Tylomelania hannelorae von Rintelen & Glaubrecht, 2008

= Tylomelania hannelorae =

Species of gastropod

Tylomelania hannelorae is a species of freshwater snail with an operculum, an aquatic gastropod mollusk in the family Pachychilidae.

The specific name hannelorae is in honor of Hannelore Glaubrecht, who participated on the malacological research.

== Distribution ==
This species occurs in Lake Mahalona, Sulawesi, Indonesia. Its type locality is Lake Mahalona.

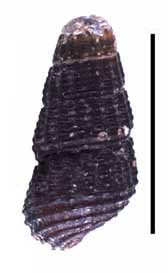
An abapertural view of a shell of a holotype of Tylomelania hannelorae.

== Ecology ==
The females of Tylomelania hannelorae usually have 1-2 embryos in their brood pouch. Newly hatched snails of Tylomelania hannelorae have a shell height of 2.4-3.1 mm.
