= Tylomelania abendanoni =

- An apertural view of a shell of Tylomelania abendanoni

Scientific classification
- Kingdom: Animalia
- Phylum: Mollusca
- Class: Gastropoda
- Subclass: Caenogastropoda
- Family: Pachychilidae
- Genus: Tylomelania
- Species: T. abendanoni

Binomial name
- Tylomelania abendanoni (Kruimel, 1913)

Synonyms
- Melania abendanoni Kruimel, 1913

Species of gastropod

Tylomelania abendanoni is a species of freshwater snail with an operculum, an aquatic gastropod mollusk in the family Pachychilidae.

The specific name abendanoni is in honor of Dutch malacologist Eduard Cornelius Abendanon (1878–1962).

== Distribution ==
This species occurs in Malili Lakes, Sulawesi, Indonesia.

== Ecology ==
Tylomelania abendanoni is a lacustrine species.

The females of Tylomelania abendanoni usually have 1–4 embryos in their brood pouch. Newly hatched snails of Tylomelania abendanoni have a shell height of 1.0–6.5 mm.
