= Amphidromus puspae =

Scientific classification
- Kingdom: Animalia
- Phylum: Mollusca
- Class: Gastropoda
- Order: Stylommatophora
- Family: Camaenidae
- Genus: Amphidromus
- Species: A. puspae

Binomial name
- Amphidromus puspae Dharma, 1993

Synonyms
- Amphidromus (Amphidromus) puspae Dharma, 1993 alternative representation

Species of tree snail

Amphidromus puspae is a species of air-breathing tree snail, an arboreal gastropod mollusk in the family Camaenidae.

== Description ==
The length of this shell attains 59.4 mm.

== Distribution ==
This species is endemic to Sumatra, Indonesia.
