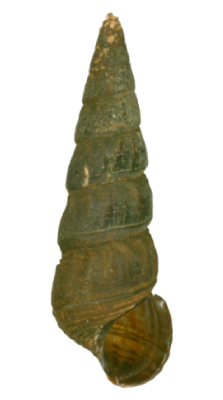
- An apertural view of a shell of Tylomelania wallacei.

Scientific classification
- Kingdom: Animalia
- Phylum: Mollusca
- Class: Gastropoda
- Subclass: Caenogastropoda
- Order: incertae sedis
- Family: Pachychilidae
- Genus: Tylomelania
- Species: T. wallacei

Binomial name
- Tylomelania wallacei (Reeve, 1860)

Synonyms
- Melania perfecta var. wallacei Reeve, 1860

= Tylomelania wallacei =

Species of gastropod

Tylomelania wallacei is a species of freshwater snail with an operculum, an aquatic gastropod mollusk in the family Pachychilidae.

== Distribution ==
This species occurs in Maros karst, Sulawesi, Indonesia.

== Ecology ==
Tylomelania wallacei is a riverine species.
