= Tylomelania kruimeli =

Conservation status
- Critically Endangered (IUCN 3.1)

Scientific classification
- Kingdom: Animalia
- Phylum: Mollusca
- Class: Gastropoda
- Subclass: Caenogastropoda
- Family: Pachychilidae
- Genus: Tylomelania
- Species: T. kruimeli

Binomial name
- Tylomelania kruimeli von Rintelen & Glaubrecht, 2003

Species of gastropod

Tylomelania kruimeli is a species of freshwater snail with an operculum, an aquatic gastropod mollusk in the family Pachychilidae.

The specific name kruimeli is in honor of Dutch malacologist Jan Herman Kruimel (1884-1916).

== Distribution ==
This species is endemic to the Lake Mahalona, Sulawesi, Indonesia.

The type locality is north-eastern corner of the Lake Mahalona.

== Description ==
The shape of the shell is conical. The shell has 4-9 whorls.

The width of the shell is 7.5-29.3 mm. The height of the shell is 13.9-69.3 mm.

== Ecology ==
This lacustrine species lives on the hard substrate.

There are developing 3-14 embryos develop in a brood pouch. Females gave birth to 2-14 juveniles. The height of the shell of juveniles at birth is 6.5-11.0 mm.
