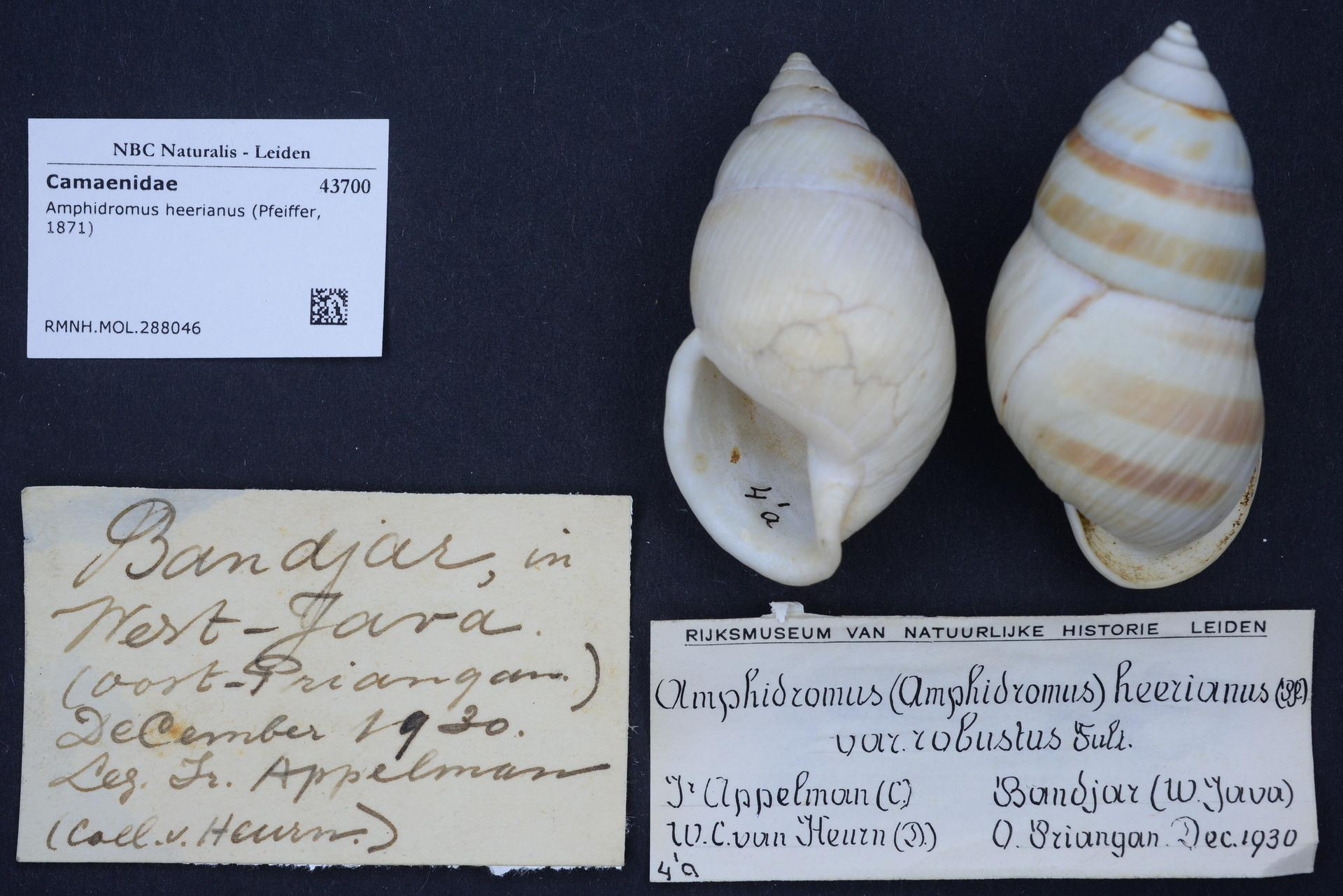
- Shell of Amphidromus heerianus (specimen at Naturalis Biodiversity Center)

Scientific classification
- Kingdom: Animalia
- Phylum: Mollusca
- Class: Gastropoda
- Order: Stylommatophora
- Family: Camaenidae
- Genus: Amphidromus
- Species: A. heerianus

Binomial name
- Amphidromus heerianus (L. Pfeiffer, 1871)

Synonyms
- Bulimus heeri Mousson, 1849 ·nomen oblitum (original name, senior synonym of Amphidromus heerianus (L. Pfeiffer, 1871); Bulimus heerianus L. Pfeiffer, 1871 (original combination)

= Amphidromus heerianus =

Species of tree snail

Amphidromus heerianus is a species of air-breathing tree snail, an arboreal gastropod mollusk in the family Camaenidae.

== Description ==
The length of the shell varies between 43 mm and 53 mm, its diameter between 24 mm and 28 mm.

The shell is perforate and ovate-conic, appearing rather thin and rudely striate. It is sculptured with very fine and close spiral striae. Its color is pale tawny-whitish, densely streaked with cinnamon, and it exhibits only a slight shine. The spire presents a broadly conic shape with a rather acute apex, and the suture appears superficial and somewhat hair-margined. Comprising six a little convex whorls, the body whorl is more swollen and a little shorter than the spire, featuring a narrow white umbilical patch. The aperture lies slightly oblique and has a somewhat rhombic-oval shape, appearing white and glossy inside. The peristome is rather broadly expanded and narrowly recurved, white, with its margins joined by an entering milk-white callus. The columellar margin is dilated and reflexed.

== Distribution ==
This species is endemic to Java, Indonesia.
