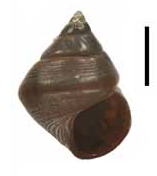
- An apertural view of a shell of a holotype of Tylomelania sinabartfeldi.

Scientific classification
- Domain: Eukaryota
- Kingdom: Animalia
- Phylum: Mollusca
- Class: Gastropoda
- Subclass: Caenogastropoda
- Family: Pachychilidae
- Genus: Tylomelania
- Species: T. sinabartfeldi

Binomial name
- Tylomelania sinabartfeldi von Rintelen & Glaubrecht, 2008

= Tylomelania sinabartfeldi =

Species of gastropod

Tylomelania sinabartfeldi is a species of freshwater snail with an operculum, an aquatic gastropod mollusk in the family Pachychilidae.

The specific name sinabartfeldi is in honor of Sina Bartfeld, who contributed to supporting the malacological research.

== Distribution ==
This species occurs in the Larona River, in Sulawesi, Indonesia. Its type locality is the Larona River.

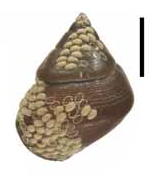
An abapertural view of a shell of a holotype of Tylomelania sinabartfeldi.

== Ecology ==
The females of Tylomelania sinabartfeldi usually have 11-67 embryos in their brood pouch.
