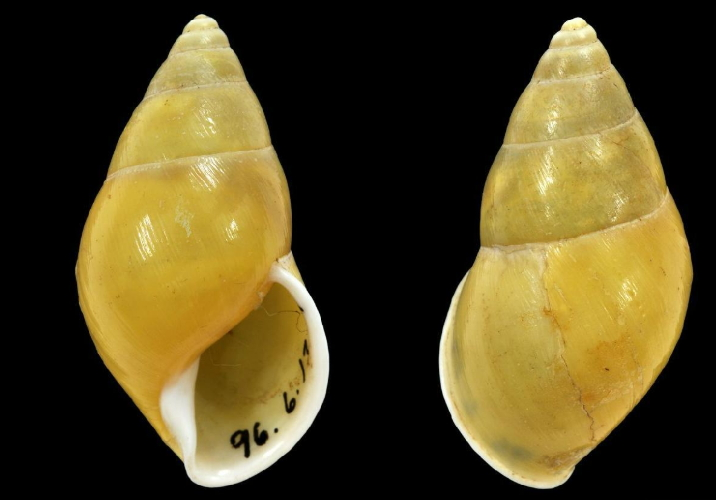
- Shell of Amphidromus alticola (lectotype at the Natural History Museum, London)

Scientific classification
- Kingdom: Animalia
- Phylum: Mollusca
- Class: Gastropoda
- Order: Stylommatophora
- Family: Camaenidae
- Genus: Amphidromus
- Species: A. alticola

Binomial name
- Amphidromus alticola Fulton, 1896

= Amphidromus alticola =

Species of gastropod

Amphidromus alticola is a species of air-breathing land snail, a terrestrial pulmonate gastropod mollusc in the family Camaenidae.

== Description ==
The length of the shell attains 37 mm, its diameter 20 mm.

(Original description) This shell exhibits both dextral and sinistral coiling. It is thin, and displays oblique striations. It is uniformly yellow and glossy, with a thread-like white fillet at the suture. The umbilicus is nearly or entirely obscured. The outer lip is white and slightly reflected. The columella can be erect, arcuate, or somewhat distorted. The shell comprises six slightly convex whorls, with the body whorl accounting for two-thirds of the shell's total length.

== Distribution ==
The type species was found in Java, Indonesia.
