= Tylomelania lalemae =

- An apertural view of a shell of Tylomelania lalemae.

Scientific classification
- Domain: Eukaryota
- Kingdom: Animalia
- Phylum: Mollusca
- Class: Gastropoda
- Subclass: Caenogastropoda
- Family: Pachychilidae
- Genus: Tylomelania
- Species: T. lalemae

Binomial name
- Tylomelania lalemae (Kruimel, 1913)

Synonyms
- Melania lalemae Kruimel, 1913

Species of gastropod

Tylomelania lalemae is a species of freshwater snail with an operculum, an aquatic gastropod mollusk in the family Pachychilidae.

== Distribution ==
This species occurs in Malili Lakes, Sulawesi, Indonesia.

== Ecology ==
Tylomelania lalemae is a lacustrine species.
