= Lake Towuti =

Lake in Sulawesi, Indonesia

Towuti
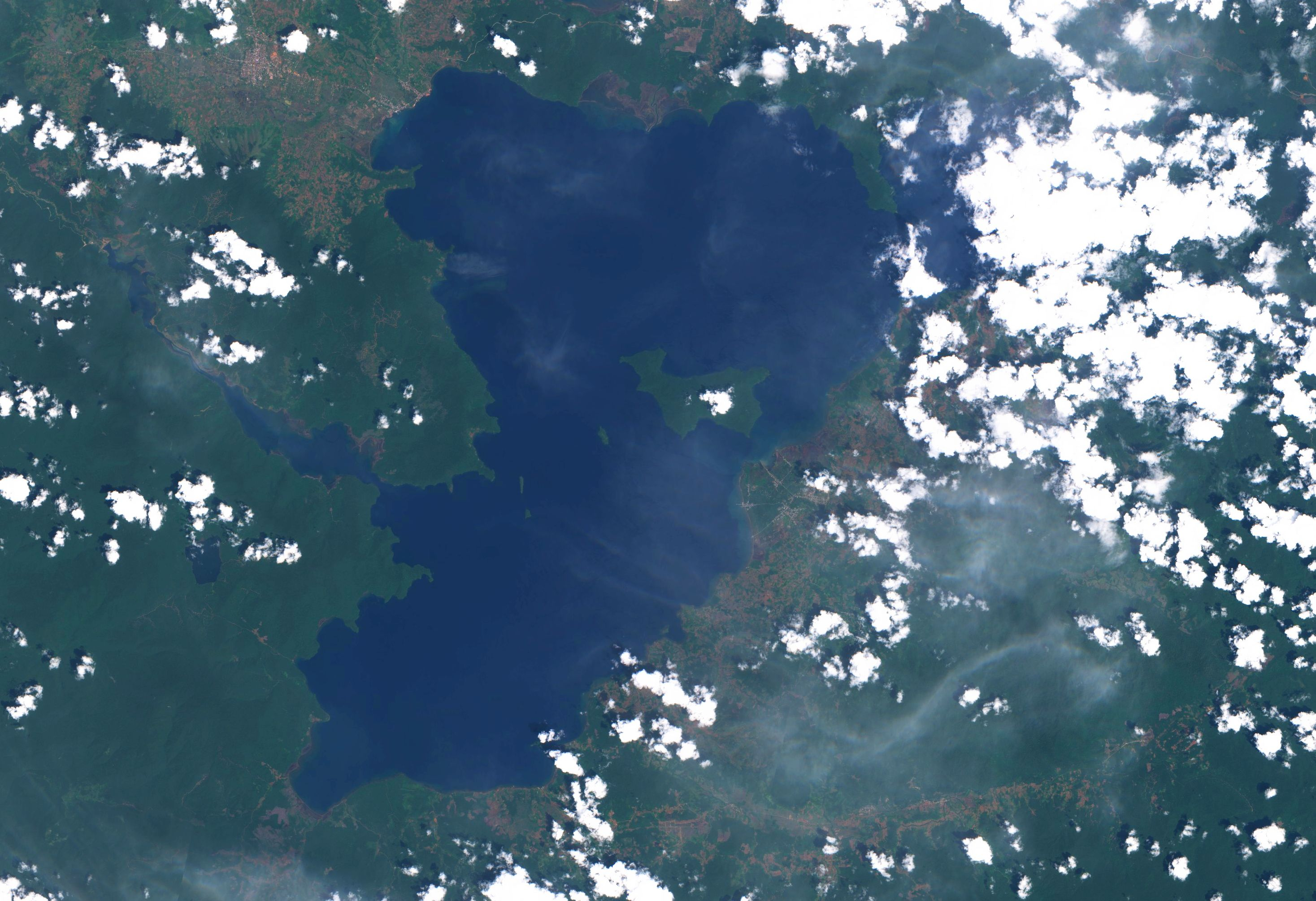

- Location within Indonesia Location within Sulawesi
- Location: South Sulawesi, Indonesia
- Coordinates: 2°45′0″S 121°30′0″E
- Type: Tectonic
- Basin countries: Indonesia
- Surface area: 561.1 km^{2} (216.6 sq mi)
- Average depth: 120 m (390 ft)
- Max. depth: 203 m (666 ft)
- Water volume: 67.33 km^{3} (16.15 cu mi)
- Surface elevation: 293 m (961 ft)

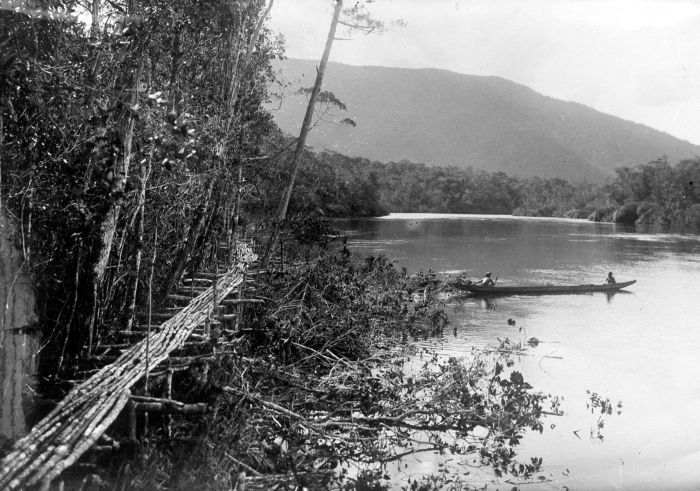
Lake Towuti in 1930

Lake Towuti (Indonesian: Danau Towuti) is a lake in East Luwu Regency, South Sulawesi province, Indonesia. Surrounded by mountains, it is the largest lake of the island of Sulawesi and one of the five lakes of the Malili Lake system (the other being Matano, and the small Mahalona, Masapi and Lontoa (Wawantoa)). The Larona River flows from the lake to the Boni Bay. The town Laronda is located on its shore.

== Ecology ==
Together with the other lakes in the Malili Lake system, Towuti has a large number of endemic fishes (Telmatherinid sail-fin silversides, Glossogobius and Mugilogobius gobies, Nomorhamphus halfbeaks and Oryzias ricefishes), Caridina shrimps, Parathelphusid crabs (Nautilothelphusa, Parathelphusa and Syntripsa) and Tylomelania snails.

Among these, Caridina spongicola lives on freshwater sponges, making it one of only two known commensal species of freshwater shrimp (the other is a Limnocaridina shrimp that lives in mussels in Lake Tanganyika, East Africa).

== See also ==
- List of lakes of Indonesia
