= Paul Sarasin =

Swiss naturalist and ethnologist

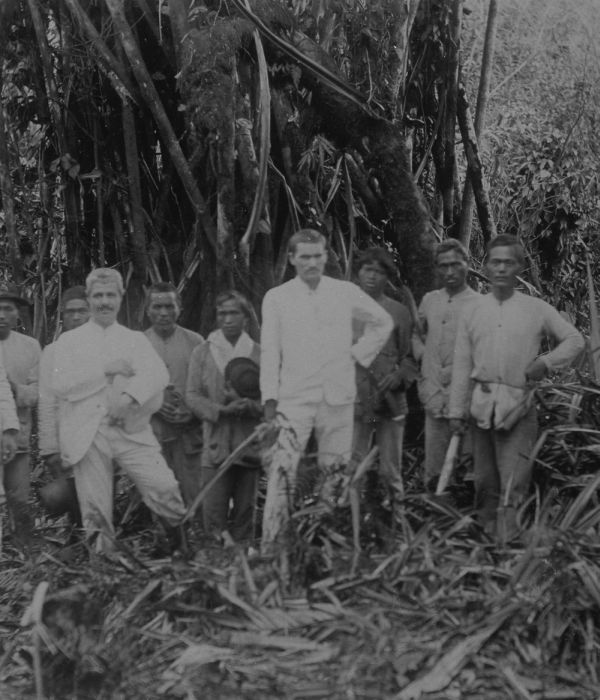
Fritz Sarasin and Paul Sarasin during their expedition to Celebes.

Paul Sarasin, full name Paul Benedict Sarasin (11 December 1856 – 7 April 1929) was a Swiss naturalist and ethnologist. He is known as the founder of National parks in Switzerland.

== Life and work ==
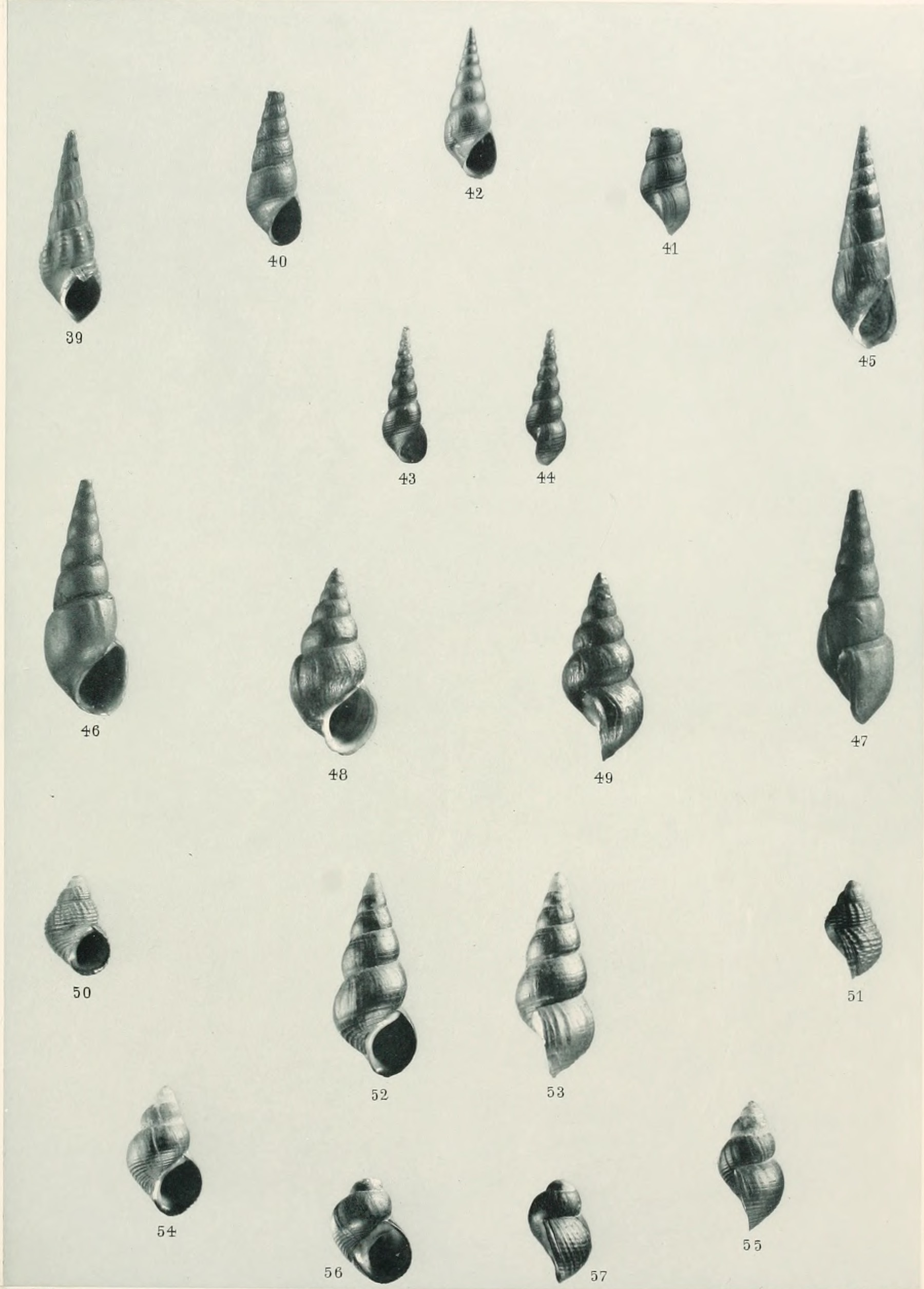
In Celebes the Sarasins explored the geographical distribution of certain molluscs to support their theory of a gradual change between regions. Illustration from one of their books.

Paul Sarasin studied medicine and natural science at the University of Basel, with Leopold Ruetimeyer, where he also met Fritz Sarasin, and at the University of Würzburg. His dissertation titled "Die Entwicklungsgeschichte der Bithynia tentaculata" was about the developmental history of a small aquatic snail.

Paul Sarasin was second cousin to Fritz Sarasin. Paul and Fritz did not only work and travel together for scientific purposes, but also had a close life-long friendship. Both had their origins in the rich and powerful patrician families (Patriziat), which ruled their native city of Basel at the time.

The Sarasins conducted research in various fields within the natural sciences, and they amassed a collection of zoological and geological objects (namely Molluscs). They later developed interests both in anthropology and ethnology; they photographed and interviewed people, noted measurements of the human body, recorded their language, and collected works of art.

Paul and Fritz Sarasin made several scientific expeditions to Ceylon (now Sri Lanka) and Celebes (now Sulawesi). After their first journey to Ceylon in 1883–86, they stayed in Berlin from 1886 to 1893 for evaluation and publication of results. In the years 1890, 1902 and 1907, they travelled again to Ceylon, and in 1893–96 to Celebes. After staying from 1896 to 1902 in Basel, they went from 1902 to 1903 a second time to Celebes.

In Celebes they tried to solve an open scientific question related to the theory of evolution of Charles Darwin and Alfred Russel Wallace, about a detail concerned with the geographical distribution of plants and animals called the Wallace Line, that is whether Celebes belonged in this regard more to Asia or to Australia. A network of scientists publishing in English, German, French and Dutch competed for an answer to this dubiety. Instead of a sharp line, the Sarasins proposed a zone of gradual change and asked to research about the kind of connections of the land which would explain the existing populations.

In the context of the question of the origin and the evolution of man, Wallace had proposed a second line, Wallace's other line east of the first line, hence called, separating two distinct groups of men: the Malay people in the West and the Papuan people in the East. To clarify this problem, the Sarasins explored different groups and tribes in Ceylon and Celebes, which they saw as varieties of men created differently by evolution and at different stages of biological and cultural development. In Ceylon, they visited and studied intensively a tribe called the Weddas, which they considered to be the oldest and the most original population of Ceylon, living mostly as hunters in the mountains and inner parts of Ceylon. They compared them to other groups in Ceylon, such as the Tamils and the Sinhalese. Later, the Sarasins found a group of people in Celebes, in their opinion similar to the Weddas, called the Toala and Toraja.

For their research, the Sarasins crossed Celebes seven times on different routes. Since the island was at this time only loosely controlled by the colonial administration of the Netherlands, they had to travel through mostly unknown areas of the nearly independent kingdoms of Luwu, Sidenreng and Bone. These kingdoms belonged to the cultural groups named Bugis or Makassars. Hierarchically structured, each with a king on top, elected by noble families, and the associated parliament of lower nobles, they competed for power and resources, like slaves, to produce coffee and spices, which they sold to the world-market. Lower groups of the Bugis, and tribes from the inner mountainous parts of Celebes, like the Toraja, lived also, more or less, in a kind of a slavery. According to the scientist, B.C.Schär, the research of the Sarasin later led to the inclusion of these areas into the Dutch colonial imperium.

When Fritz Sarasin travelled, 1910–1911, to the islands of the New Caledonia in the South Pacific, he met there with another ethnologist from Basel, Felix Speiser, who at this time did his research on the New Hebrides.

Paul and Fritz could finance their research from their own, mostly inherited, wealth.

From 1906 to 1912, Paul Sarasin was President of the Commission for the Ethnological Museum of Basel. Paul and Fritz donated their rich collections to the Ethnological Museum. Alone from Celebes, they brought back to Basel a count of 1000 animals and plants, as well as 680 ethnographic objects and 600 photos. Along with Hermann Fischer-Sigwart, Jakob Heierli, Albert Heim, Hans Schardt, Carl Schroter, Ernest Wiczek, and Friedrich Zschokke, they were the founders of the Schweizerische Naturschutzkommission (the Swiss Nature Conservation Commission).

At the age of 62, Paul married, in 1918, Anna Maria Hohenester, and had two children with her.

== Taxa named in his honor ==
Paul and Fritz Sarasin are commemorated in the scientific names of five species of reptiles:

- Amphiesma sarasinorum,
- Correlophus sarasinorum,
- Nessia sarasinorum,
- Pseudorabdion sarasinorum, and
- Sphenomorphus sarasinorum.

And fish:

- Sarasin's goby Mugilogobius sarasinorum is named in the cousins honor.
- The Rainbow Telmatherina sarasinorum Kottelat, 1991

There are seven species, two genera and one subfamily of harvestmen named after them.

== Bibliography ==
- (in German) Sarasin P. & Sarasin F. (1898–1901). "Materialien zur Naturgeschichte der Insel Celebes". Kreidel's Verlag, Wiesbaden.
  - (1898). Band 1: Die Süsswasser-Mollusken von Celebes.
  - (1899). Band 2: Die Land-Mollusken von Celebes. I-VIII, 1–248, pls 1-31.
  - (1901). Band 3: Über die geologische Geschichte der Insel Celebes auf Grund der Thierverbreitung
  - (1901). Band 4: Entwurf einer geographisch-geologischen Beschreibung der Insel Celebes / Untersuchung einiger Gesteinssuiten, gesammelt in Celebes von Paul & Fritz Sarasin; von C. Schmidt.
- (in German) Sarasin P. & Sarasin F. (1905). Reisen in Celebes. Wiesbaden. Volume 1, Volume 2.
- (in German) Sarasin P. & Sarasin F. "Ergebnisse naturwissenschaftlicher Forschungen auf Ceylon". ["Results of Natural History Research in Ceylon."] Wiesbaden.
  - (1887–1893). Band 1–3.
  - (1908). "Band 4: Die Steinzeit auf Ceylon". [Volume Four: The Stone Age of Ceylon.] translated by David Bulbeck: English translation PDF.
