= Fritz Sarasin =

Swiss naturalist (1859–1942)

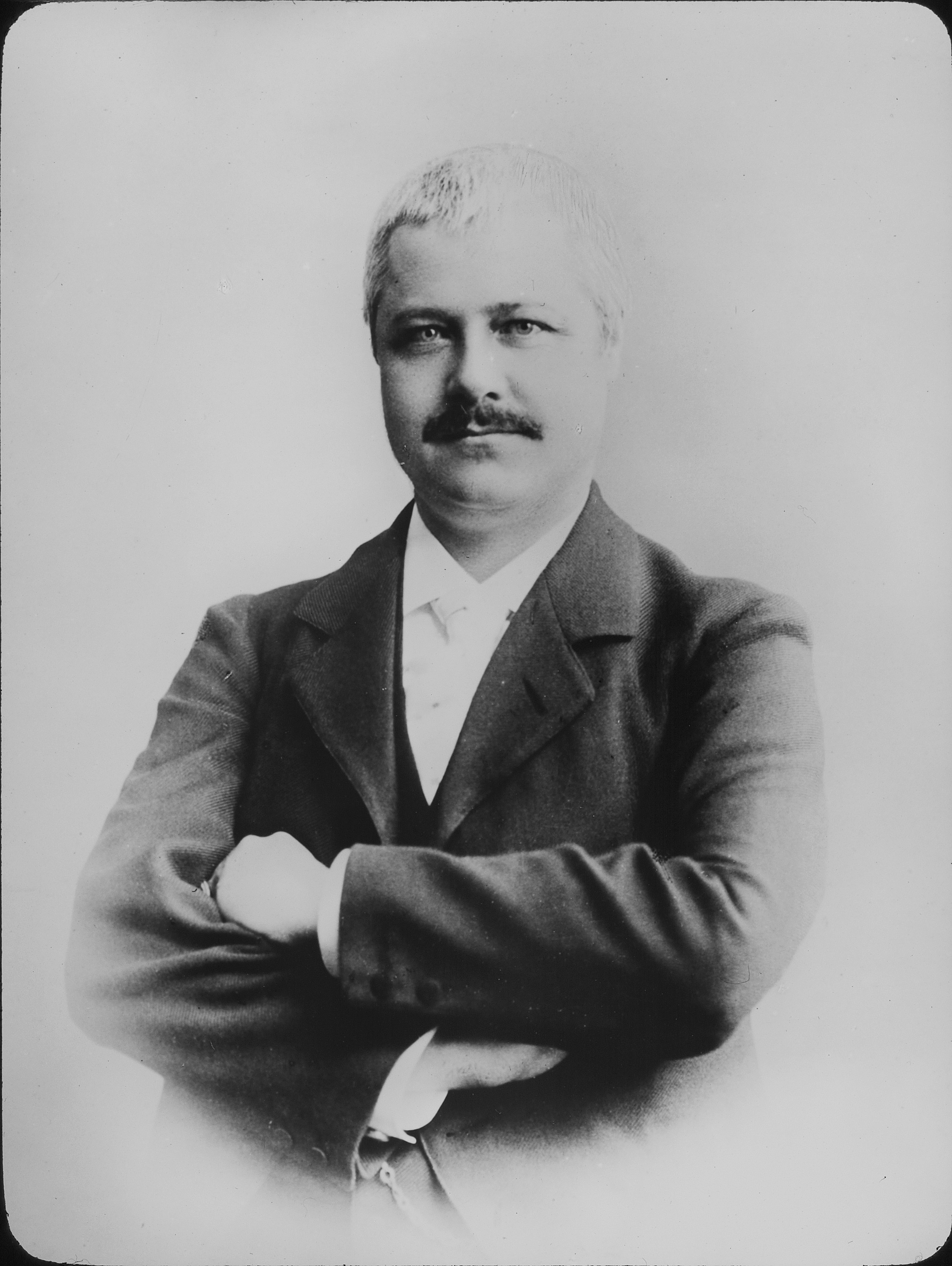
Fritz Sarasin

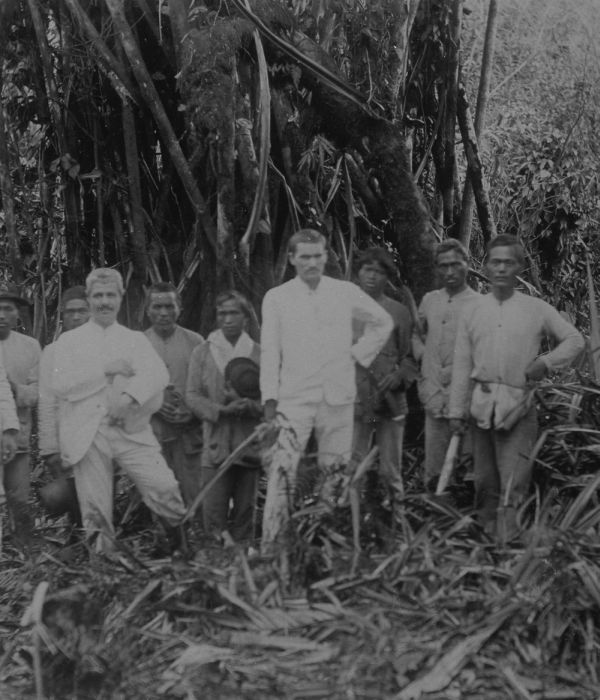
Fritz Sarasin and Paul Sarasin during their expedition to Celebes.

Fritz Sarasin, full name Karl Friedrich Sarasin (3 December 1859 – 23 March 1942) was a Swiss naturalist.

He was a second cousin of Paul Sarasin. They made a scientific expedition to Celebes (now Sulawesi).

== Taxon named in his honor ==
Paul and Fritz Sarasin are commemorated in the scientific names of five species of reptiles:

- Amphiesma sarasinorum,
- Correlophus sarasinorum,
- Nessia sarasinorum,
- Pseudorabdion sarasinorum, and
- Sphenomorphus sarasinorum.

And fish:

- Sarasin's goby Mugilogobius sarasinorum is named in the cousins honor.
- The Rainbow Telmatherina sarasinorum Kottelat, 1991

There are seven species, two genera and one subfamily of harvestmen named after them.

== Bibliography ==
He has published some of scientific works together with Paul Sarasin.

- Sarasin F. & Roux J. (eds.) (1913–1918). "Nova Caledonia. Forschungen in Neu-Caledonien und auf den Loyalty-Inseln. Recherches scientifiques en Nouvelle-Calédonie et aux iles Loyalty". Wiesbaden.
  - (1913). A. Zoologie. Volume I.
  - (1915). A. Zoologie. Volume II.
  - (1923). A. Zoologie. Volume III.
  - (1925). A. Zoologie. Volume IV.
- Aus einem glücklichen Leben. Biographische Notizen, Frobenius AG, Basel 1941.
