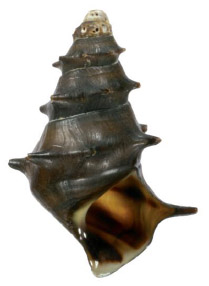
- Shell of Brotia pagodula

Scientific classification
- Kingdom: Animalia
- Phylum: Mollusca
- Class: Gastropoda
- Subclass: Caenogastropoda
- Order: incertae sedis
- Superfamily: Cerithioidea
- Family: Pachychilidae
- Genus: Brotia; H. Adams, 1866

Type species
- Melania pagodula Gould, 1847

Synonyms
- Antimelania P. Fischer & Crosse, 1892; Brotia (Brotia) H. Adams, 1866; Melania (Brotia) Adams, 1866; Wanga Chen, 1943

= Brotia =

Brotia Temporal range: Miocene - recent

Genus of gastropods

Brotia is a genus of Southeast Asian freshwater snails, gastropod molluscs in the taxonomic family Pachychilidae.

The generic name Brotia is apparently in honor of a Swiss malacologist Auguste Louis Brot (1821-1896).

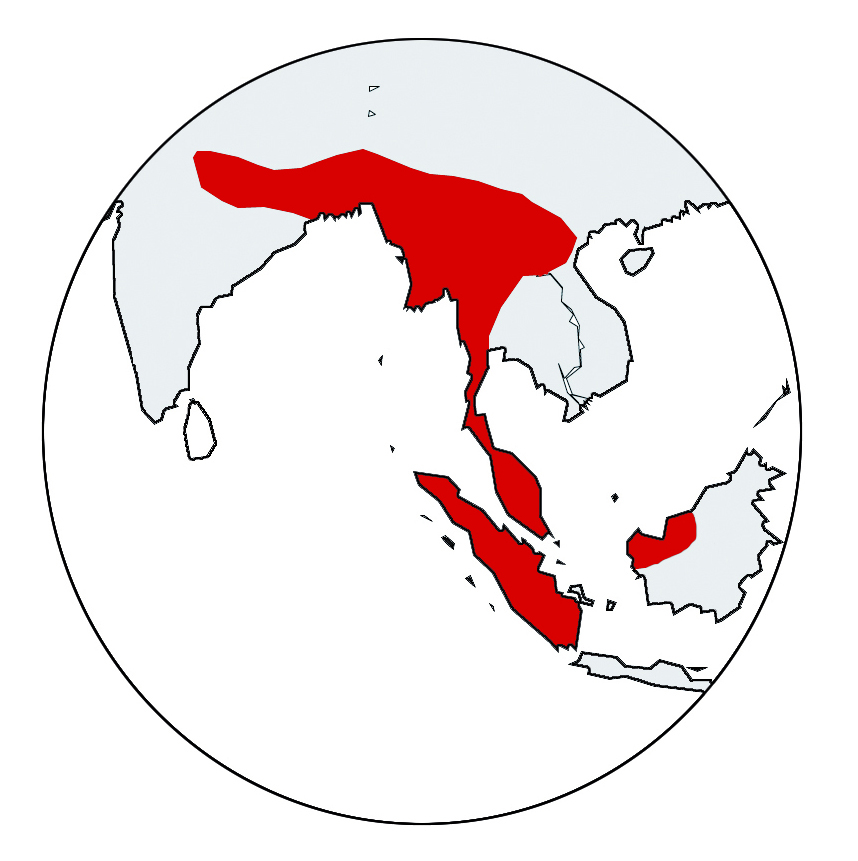
Distribution of Brotia

== Distribution ==
Species of Brotia occur in freshwater habitats of Southeast Asia, ranging from Northern India in the west through to Sumatra in the east. This range includes India, Myanmar, Bangladesh, Thailand, Laos, Vietnam, China (1 species), Cambodia, Malaysia and Indonesia (Sumatra and Borneo only).

== Biology ==
Species are found predominantly in fast flowing, well oxygenated rivers, occasionally also in lakes. They are gonochoristic, and viviparous, retaining developing eggs and young in a special brood pouch.

== Species ==
Species within the genus Brotia include:

- † Brotia alpina (F. Sandberger, 1871)
- Brotia annamita Köhler, Holford M., Do & Ho, 2009
- Brotia angulifera Brot, 1872 - incertae sedis
- Brotia armata (Brandt, 1874)
- Brotia assamensis (Nevill, 1885) - incertae sedis
- Brotia beaumetzi (Brot, 1887) - incertae sedis
- Brotia binodosa (Blanford, 1903)
- † Brotia bittneri (Oppenheim, 1895)
- Brotia boenana (Brot, 1881)
- Brotia borneensis (Schepman, 1896) - incertae sedis
- † Brotia castellaunensis (Boussac, 1911)
- Brotia citrina (Brot, 1868)
- Brotia clavaeformis (Brot, 1874)
- Brotia costula (Rafinesque, 1833)
- Brotia cylindrus (Brot, 1886) - incertae sedis
- Brotia dautzenbergiana (Morlet, 1884)
- Brotia episcopalis (H. Lea & I. Lea, 1851)
- Brotia godwini (Brot, 1875)
- Brotia henriettae (Griffith & Pidgeon, 1834)
- Brotia herculea (Gould, 1846)
- Brotia hoabinhensis Köhler, Holford, Do & Ho, 2009
- Brotia huberi Thach, 2021
- Brotia indragirica (von Martens, 1900)
- Brotia insolita (Brot, 1868)
- Brotia iravadica (Blanford, 1869)
- Brotia jullieni (Deshayes, 1874)
- Brotia kelantanesis (Preston, 1907)
- Brotia laodelectata Köhler, 2008
- † Brotia lhazeensis Yü, 1982
- † Brotia lombersensis (Noulet, 1867)
- † Brotia majevitzae (Oppenheim, 1901)
- Brotia manningi Brandt, 1968
- Brotia mariae Köhler, 2008
- Brotia microsculpta Brandt, 1968
- Brotia pageli (Thiele, 1908)
- Brotia pagodula (Gould, 1847) - type species
- † Brotia palaeocostula Gurung, Takayasu & Matsuoka, 1997
- Brotia paludiformis (Solem, 1966)
- Brotia peninsularis (Brandt, 1974)
- Brotia persculpta (Ehrmann, 1922)
- Brotia praetermissa Köhler & Glaubrecht, 2002
- Brotia pseudoasperata Brandt, 1968
- Brotia pseudosulcospira (Brandt, 1968)
- Brotia siamensis (Brot, 1886)
- Brotia solemiana (Brandt, 1968)
- Brotia sooloensis (Reeve, 1859) - incertae sedis
- Brotia spinata (Godwin-Austen, 1872) - incertae sedis
- Brotia subgloriosa (Brandt, 1968)
- Brotia sumatrensis (Brot, 1875)
- Brotia torquata (von dem Busch, 1842)
- Brotia verbecki (Brot, 1886)
- Brotia wykoffi (Brandt, 1974)
- Brotia yunnanensis Köhler, Du & Yang, 2010
- Brotia zonata (Benson, 1836) - incertae sedis

Synonyms:

- Brotia asperata (Lamarck, 1822): synonym of Jagora asperata (Lamarck, 1822)
- Brotia baccata (Gould, 1847): synonym of Brotia henriettae (Gray, 1834)
- Brotia delavayana Heude, 1888 : synonym of Sulcospira delavayana (Heude, 1888)
- † Brotia escheri aquitanica (Noulet, 1846): synonym of † Tinnyea aquitanica (Noulet, 1846)
- † Brotia escheri auingeri (Handmann, 1882): synonym of † Tinnyea lauraea (Matheron, 1842)
- Brotia hainanensis (Brot, 1872): synonym of Sulcospira hainanensis (Brot, 1874)
- Brotia hamonvillei : synonym of Sulcospira tonkiniana (Morelet, 1886)
- Brotia infracostata (Mousson, 1848): synonym of Sulcospira infracostata (Mousson, 1848)
- Brotia proteus (Bavay & Dautzenberg, 1908): synonym of Sulcospira dakrongensis Köhler, Holford, Do & Ho, 2009
- Brotia swinhoei (H. Adams, 1870): synonym of Sulcospira swinhoei (H. Adams, 1870)
- Brotia testudinaria (von dem Busch, 1842): synonym of Sulcospira testudinaria (von dem Busch, 1842)
- Brotia tourannensis: synonym of Sulcospira tourannensis (Souleyet, 1852)
- Brotia variabilis (Benson, 1836): synonym of Brotia costula (Rafinesque, 1833)

Variability of shells of Brotia (images in the first row are in the same ratio):

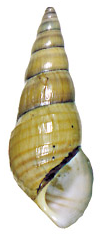
Brotia citrina

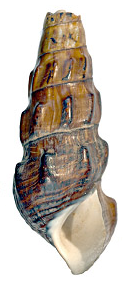
Brotia episcopalis

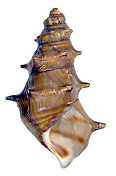
Brotia pagodula

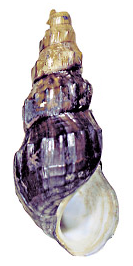
Brotia sumatrensis

Brotia verbecki

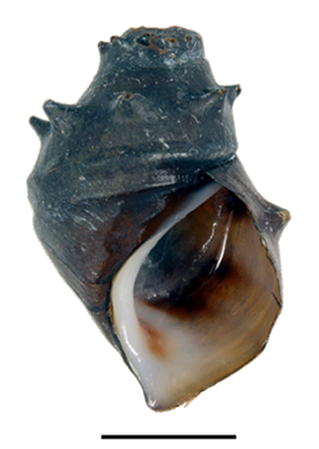
Brotia armata

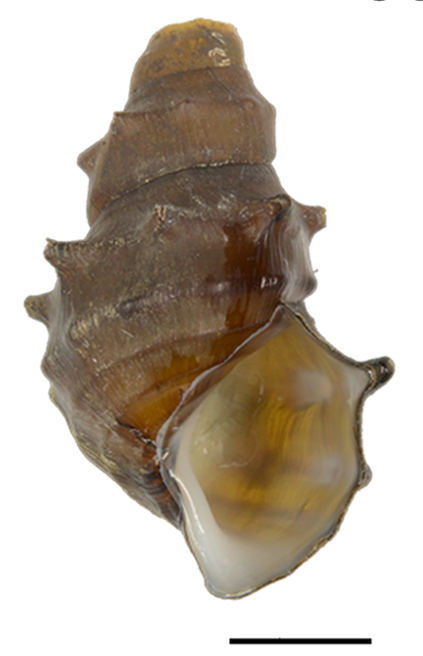
Brotia binodosa

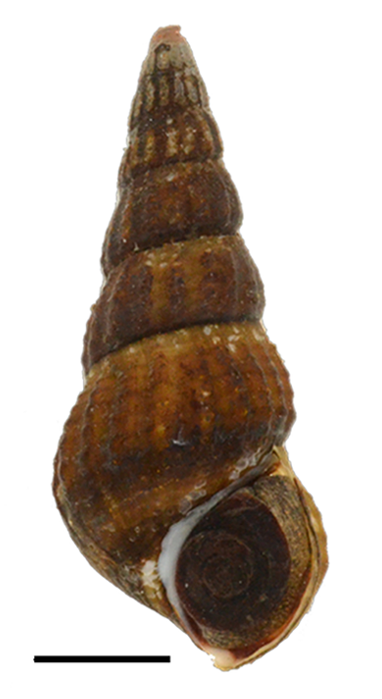
Brotia herculea
