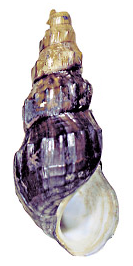
- Shell of Brotia sumatrensis

Scientific classification
- Domain: Eukaryota
- Kingdom: Animalia
- Phylum: Mollusca
- Class: Gastropoda
- Subclass: Caenogastropoda
- Family: Pachychilidae
- Genus: Brotia
- Species: B. sumatrensis

Binomial name
- Brotia sumatrensis (Brot, 1875)

Synonyms
- Melania boeana Brot, 1881 (junior synonym); Melania sumatrensis Brot, 1875 (original combination)

= Brotia sumatrensis =

Species of gastropod

Brotia sumatrensis is a species of freshwater snail with an operculum, an aquatic gastropod mollusk in the family Pachychilidae. Previously frequently synonymized with Brotia costula, biological systematics was able to molecularly distinguish the two.

== Distribution ==
- Sumatra, Indonesia
