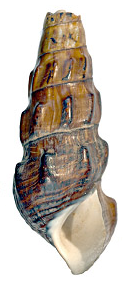
- Apertural view of the shell of Brotia episcopalis

Conservation status
- Least Concern (IUCN 3.1)

Scientific classification
- Kingdom: Animalia
- Phylum: Mollusca
- Class: Gastropoda
- Subclass: Caenogastropoda
- Order: incertae sedis
- Family: Pachychilidae
- Genus: Brotia
- Species: B. episcopalis

Binomial name
- Brotia episcopalis (H. C. Lea & I. Lea, 1851)

Synonyms
- Melania (Melanoides) palembangensis Strubell, 1897 (junior synonym); Melania episcopalis I. Lea & H. C. Lea, 1851 (original combination); Melania heros Brot, 1877 (junior synonym); Melania palembangensis Strubell, 1897; Sermyla chaperi de Morgan, 1885 (junior synonym); Sermyla perakensis de Morgan, 1885 (junior synonym)

= Brotia episcopalis =

Species of snail

Brotia episcopalis is a species of freshwater snail with an operculum, an aquatic gastropod mollusk in the family Pachychilidae.

== Taxonomy ==
In the 20th century, B. episcopalis was frequently synonymized with Brotia costula due to cryptically similar shell morphology. In the 21st century molecular data was able to distinguish this species.

== Distribution ==
This species occurs in:

- peninsular Malaysia
- Thailand

== Human use ==
Evidence of B. episcopalis being used as food has been discovered in Neolithic archaeological sites in Malaysia.
