= Brotia verbecki =

- Apertural view of a shell of Brotia verbecki

Scientific classification
- Domain: Eukaryota
- Kingdom: Animalia
- Phylum: Mollusca
- Class: Gastropoda
- Subclass: Caenogastropoda
- Family: Pachychilidae
- Genus: Brotia
- Species: B. verbecki

Binomial name
- Brotia verbecki (Brot, 1866)

Synonyms
- Melania papillosa E. von Martens, 1897 (invalid: junior homonym of Melania papillosa Reeve, 1861); Melania stricticosta E. von Martens, 1897 (junior synonym); Melania verbecki Brot, 1886 (original combination); Melania verbecki var. laevis E. von Martens, 1897 (junior synonym)

Species of gastropod

Brotia verbecki is a species of freshwater snail with an operculum, an aquatic gastropod mollusk in the family Pachychilidae.

== Distribution ==
This species occurs in:

- Sumatra, Indonesia
