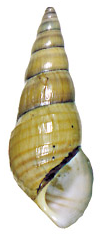
- Apertural view of a shell of Brotia citrina

Conservation status
- Vulnerable (IUCN 3.1)

Scientific classification
- Kingdom: Animalia
- Phylum: Mollusca
- Class: Gastropoda
- Subclass: Caenogastropoda
- Order: incertae sedis
- Family: Pachychilidae
- Genus: Brotia
- Species: B. citrina

Binomial name
- Brotia citrina (Brot, 1868)

Synonyms
- Melania citrina Brot, 1868; Melania dugasti Morlet, 1893; Melanica citrinoides Brot, 1886

= Brotia citrina =

Species of freshwater snail

Brotia citrina is a species of freshwater snail with an operculum, an aquatic gastropod mollusk in the family Pachychilidae.

== Distribution ==
This species occurs in Thailand.
