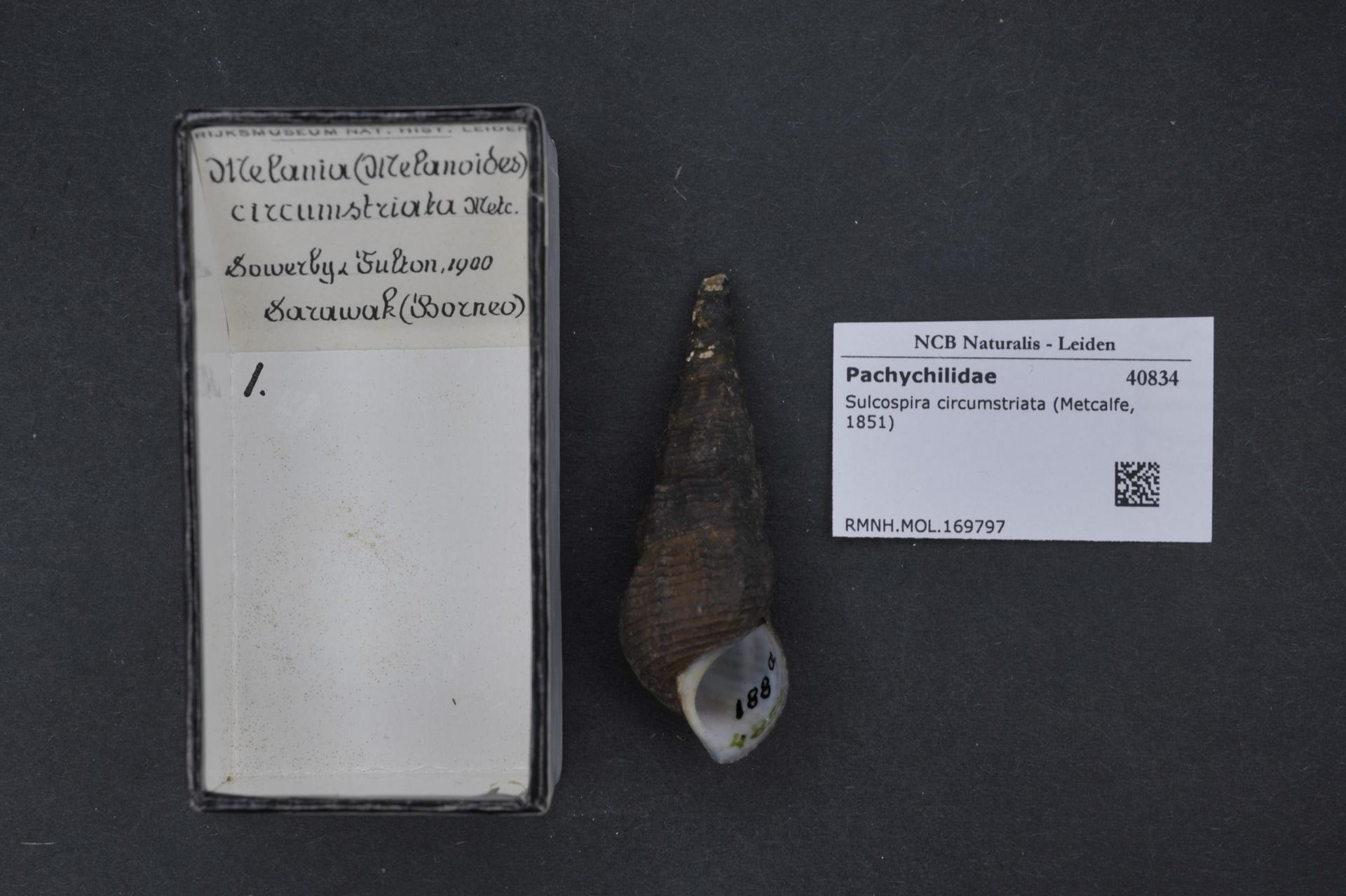
- Shell of Sulcospira circumstriata

Scientific classification
- Domain: Eukaryota
- Kingdom: Animalia
- Phylum: Mollusca
- Class: Gastropoda
- Subclass: Caenogastropoda
- Family: Pachychilidae
- Genus: Sulcospira
- Species: S. circumstriata

Binomial name
- Sulcospira circumstriata (Metcalfe, 1851)

= Sulcospira circumstriata =

Species of gastropod

Sulcospira circumstriata is a species of freshwater snail with an operculum, an aquatic gastropod mollusk in the family Pachychilidae.

== Distribution ==
This species occurs in:

- Malaysia
