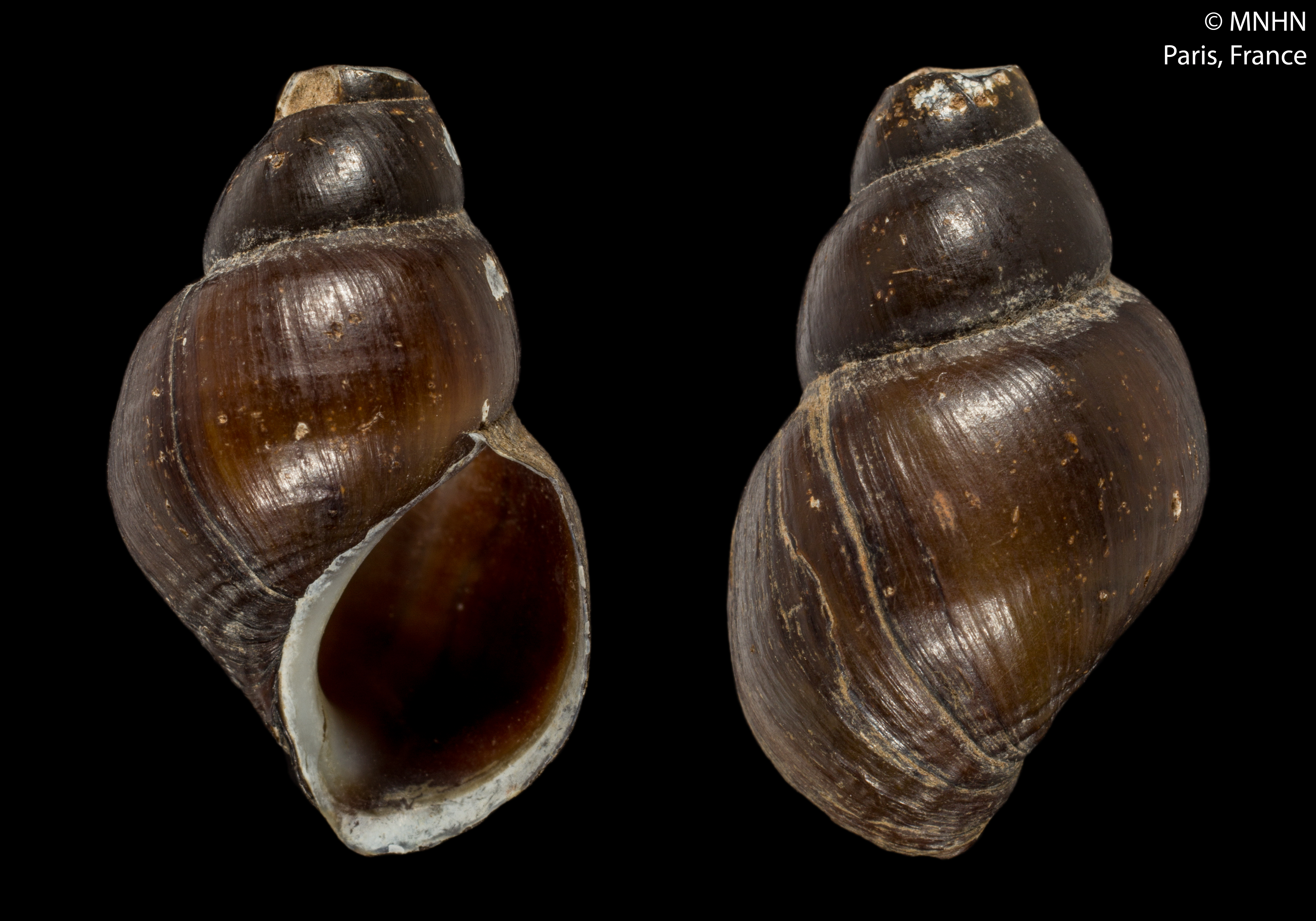
- Shell of Paracrostoma huberi (holotype at MNHN, Paris)

Scientific classification
- Kingdom: Animalia
- Phylum: Mollusca
- Class: Gastropoda
- Subclass: Caenogastropoda
- Order: incertae sedis
- Superfamily: Cerithioidea
- Family: Pachychilidae
- Genus: Paracrostoma; Cossmann, 1900

Type species
- Melania huegelii Philippi, 1843

Synonyms
- Acrostoma Brot, 1871 (invalid: junior homonym of Acrostoma Le Sauvage, 1827 [Platyhelminthes]; Brotella and Paracrostoma are replacement names); Brotella Rovereto, 1899 (invalid: junior homonym of Brotella Kaup, 1858 [Pisces]; Paracrostoma is a replacement name); Brotia (Paracrostoma) (original rank); Melania (Acrostoma) Brot, 1871 (name invalid (preoccupied))

= Paracrostoma =

Genus of gastropods

Paracrostoma is a genus of Southeast Asian freshwater snails, gastropod molluscs in the taxonomic family Pachychilidae.

== Species ==
- Paracrostoma huegelii (Philippi, 1843)
- Paracrostoma martini Köhler & Glaubrecht, 2007
- Paracrostoma tigrina Köhler & Glaubrecht, 2007

Species inquirendum

- Paracrostoma huberi Thach, 2018

Synonyms

- Paracrostoma morrisoni Brandt, 1974: synonym of Brotia armata Brandt, 1968 (junior synonym)
- Paracrostoma paludiformis Solem, 1966: synonym of Brotia paludiformis (Solem, 1966)
- Paracrostoma pseudosulcospira (Brandt, 1968): synonym of Brotia pseudosulcospira Brandt, 1968
- Paracrostoma solemiana (Brandt, 1968): synonym of Brotia solemiana Brandt, 1968
