= Pyramid slitshell =

Conservation status
- Extinct (IUCN 2.3)

- Presumed Extinct (NatureServe)

Scientific classification
- Kingdom: Animalia
- Phylum: Mollusca
- Class: Gastropoda
- Subclass: Caenogastropoda
- Order: incertae sedis
- Family: Pleuroceridae
- Genus: †Gyrotoma
- Species: †G. pyramidata

Binomial name
- †Gyrotoma pyramidata (Shuttleworth, 1845)

Synonyms
- Gyrotoma conica Brot, 1862; Gyrotoma pyramidatum Shuttleworth, 1845; Schizostoma spillmanii Lea, 1861

Species of gastropod

The pyramid slitshell, scientific name Gyrotoma pyramidata, was a species of freshwater snail, a gastropod in the Pleuroceridae family. It was endemic to the United States. It is now extinct.
