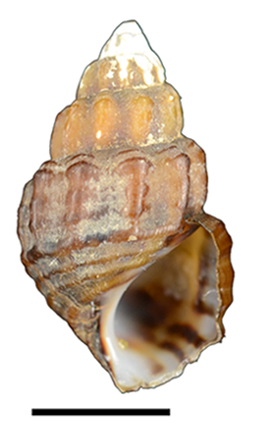
- Apertural view of a shell of Sulcospira tonkiniana. Scale bar is 10 mm.

Conservation status
- Least Concern (IUCN 3.1)

Scientific classification
- Kingdom: Animalia
- Phylum: Mollusca
- Class: Gastropoda
- Subclass: Caenogastropoda
- Family: Pachychilidae
- Genus: Sulcospira
- Species: S. tonkiniana

Binomial name
- Sulcospira tonkiniana (Morlet, 1887)

Synonyms
- Melania aubryana Heude, 1888; Melania aubryana var. attenuata Dautzenberg & Fischer, 1908; Melania aubryana var. elongata Dautzenberg & Fischer, 1908; Melania aubryana var. obliterata Dautzenberg & Fischer, 1908; Melania aubryana var. paupera Dautzenberg & Fischer, 1908; Melania aubryana var. polygonales Dautzenberg & Fischer, 1908; Melania aubryana var. robusta Dauzenberg & Fischer, 1908; Melania beaumetzi Brot, 1887; Melania hamonvillei Brot, 1887; Melania verbecki var. tonkiniana Morlet, 1887; Adamietta hamonvillei (Brot, 1887); Adamietta tonkiniana (Morelet, 1886); Brotia hamonvillei Köhler & Glaubrecht, 2002

= Sulcospira tonkiniana =

Species of gastropod

Sulcospira tonkiniana is a species of freshwater snail with an operculum, an aquatic gastropod mollusk in the family Pachychilidae.

== Distribution ==
This species occurs in Vietnam.

== Human use ==
It is a part of ornamental pet trade for freshwater aquaria.
