= Potadoma buttikoferi =

Conservation status
- Critically Endangered (IUCN 3.1)

Scientific classification
- Kingdom: Animalia
- Phylum: Mollusca
- Class: Gastropoda
- Subclass: Caenogastropoda
- Order: incertae sedis
- Family: Pachychilidae
- Genus: Potadoma
- Species: P. buttikoferi

Binomial name
- Potadoma buttikoferi (Schepman, 1888)

Synonyms
- Melania buttikoferi Schepman, 1888

Species of gastropod

Potadoma buttikoferi is a species of freshwater snail with an operculum, an aquatic gastropod mollusc in the family Pachychilidae.

== Distribution ==
This species occurs in:

- Liberia

The type locality is "on rocks in the St. Paul's River near Bavia", Liberia.
