= Pachychilus anagrammatus =

Pachychilus anagrammatus Temporal range: Upper Miocene–Pliocene

Scientific classification
- Kingdom: Animalia
- Phylum: Mollusca
- Class: Gastropoda
- Subclass: Caenogastropoda
- Superfamily: Cerithioidea
- Family: Pachychilidae
- Genus: Pachychilus
- Species: †P. anagrammatus

Binomial name
- †Pachychilus anagrammatus Dall, 1913

Species of snail

Pachychilus anagrammatus was a species of freshwater snail during the Pliocene or Upper Miocene that lived in what is now Texas.
