= Sulcospira collyra =

Conservation status
- Least Concern (IUCN 3.1)

Scientific classification
- Kingdom: Animalia
- Phylum: Mollusca
- Class: Gastropoda
- Subclass: Caenogastropoda
- Order: incertae sedis
- Family: Pachychilidae
- Genus: Sulcospira
- Species: S. collyra

Binomial name
- Sulcospira collyra Köhler, Holford, Do & Ho, 2009

Species of gastropod

Sulcospira collyra is a species of freshwater snail with an operculum, an aquatic gastropod mollusk in the family Pachychilidae.

The specific name collyra is from the Latin language. "Collyra" means elongated, because the shape of the shell is elongated.

== Distribution ==
This species occurs in Vietnam.
