= Potadoma liberiensis =

Conservation status
- Data Deficient (IUCN 3.1)

Scientific classification
- Kingdom: Animalia
- Phylum: Mollusca
- Class: Gastropoda
- Subclass: Caenogastropoda
- Order: incertae sedis
- Family: Pachychilidae
- Genus: Potadoma
- Species: P. liberiensis

Binomial name
- Potadoma liberiensis (Schepman, 1888)

Synonyms
- Melania liberiensis Schepman, 1888

Species of gastropod

Potadoma liberiensis is a species of freshwater snail with an operculum, an aquatic gastropod mollusc in the family Pachychilidae.

== Distribution ==
This species occurs in:

- Liberia
- Ivory Coast
- Guinea

The type locality is "on rocks in the St. Paul's River near Bavia", Liberia.
