= Sulcospira agrestis =

Scientific classification
- Kingdom: Animalia
- Phylum: Mollusca
- Class: Gastropoda
- Subclass: Caenogastropoda
- Order: incertae sedis
- Family: Pachychilidae
- Genus: Sulcospira
- Species: S. agrestis

Binomial name
- Sulcospira agrestis (Reeve, 1860)

Synonyms
- Melania agrestis Reeve, 1860; Brotia agrestis (Reeve, 1860); Adamietta agrestis (Reeve, 1860)

Species of gastropod

Sulcospira agrestis is a species of freshwater snail with an operculum, an aquatic gastropod mollusk in the family Pachychilidae.

== Distribution ==
This species occurs in Sabah, Borneo, Malaysia.

The type locality is Borneo.
