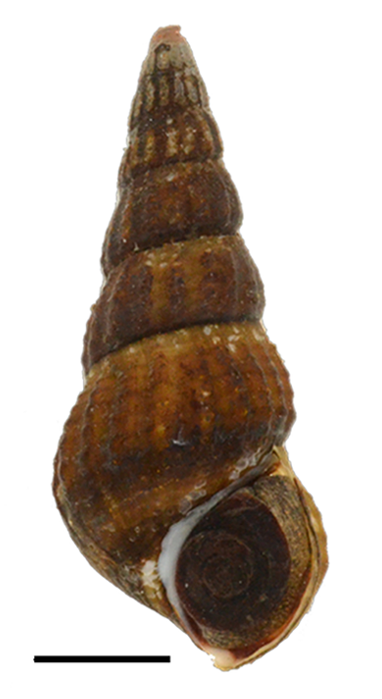
- Apertural view of a shell of Brotia herculea including operculum. Scale bar is 10 mm.

Conservation status
- Least Concern (IUCN 3.1)

Scientific classification
- Kingdom: Animalia
- Phylum: Mollusca
- Class: Gastropoda
- Subclass: Caenogastropoda
- Order: incertae sedis
- Family: Pachychilidae
- Genus: Brotia
- Species: B. herculea

Binomial name
- Brotia herculea (Gould, 1846)

Synonyms
- Melania herculea Gould, 1846; Melanoides herculea H. Adams & A. Adams, 1854; Melania balteata Reeve, 1860; Melania gloriosa Anthony, 1865; Melania peguensis Hanley & Theobald, 1876; Melania reevei Brot, 1862; Melania reevei var. imbricata Hanley & Theobald, 1876; Melania reevei var. lanceolata Nevill, 1884; Melania reevei var. soliduscula Nevill, 1884; Melania tourannensis var. beddomeana Nevill, 1885; Melania tourannensis var. compacta Nevill, 1885

= Brotia herculea =

Species of gastropod

Brotia herculea, common name the giant tower cap snail, is a species of freshwater snail with an operculum, an aquatic gastropod mollusc in the family Pachychilidae.

== Description ==
B. herculea has a taenioglossan radula. Its shell is large and turreted. The presence of axial ribs is highly variable.

== Distribution ==
This species occurs in Myanmar and Thailand.

== Human use ==
It is a part of ornamental pet trade for freshwater aquaria. It is considered low-risk for invasiveness.
