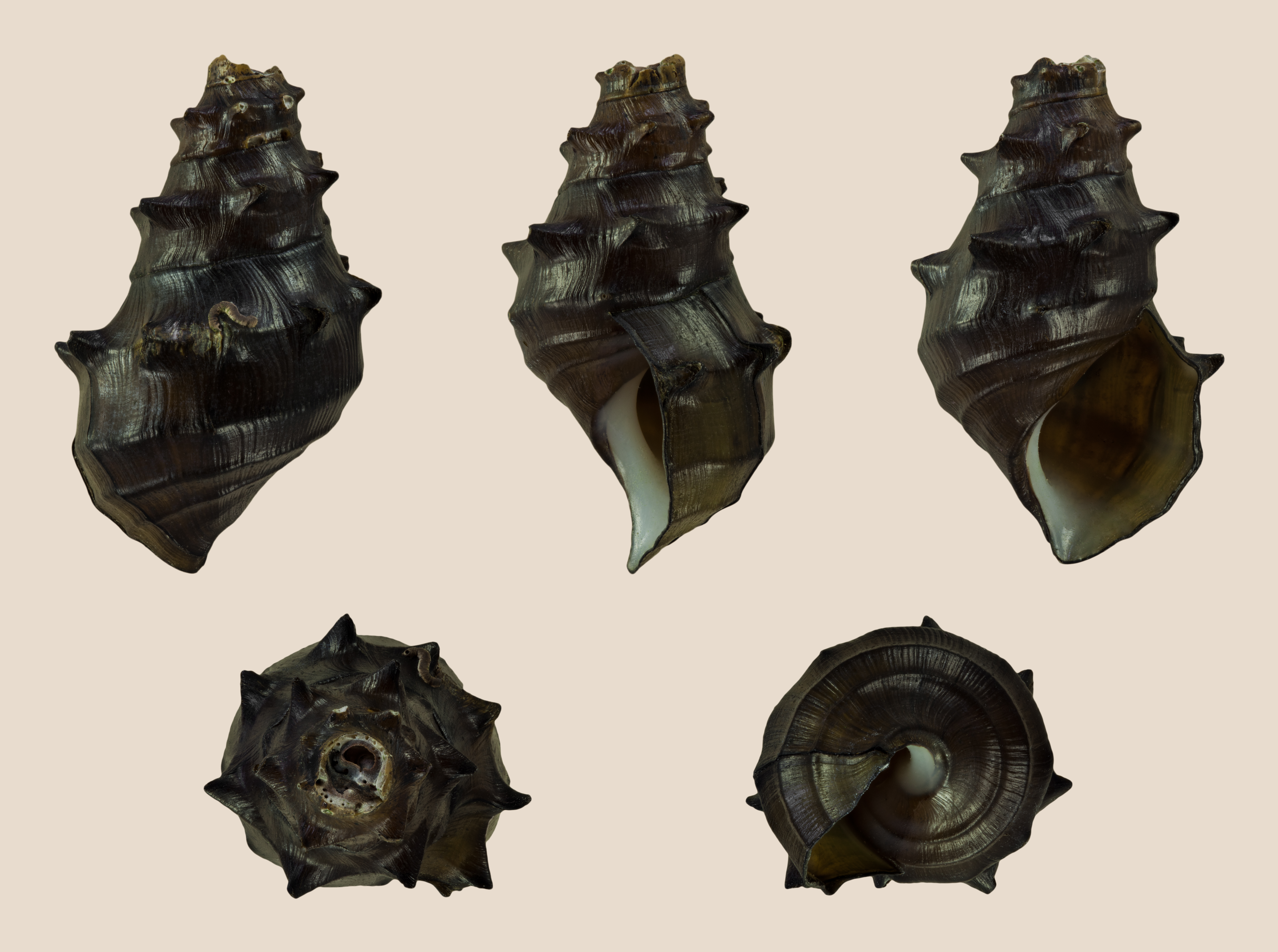
- A shell of Brotia binodosa

Conservation status
- Least Concern (IUCN 3.1)

Scientific classification
- Kingdom: Animalia
- Phylum: Mollusca
- Class: Gastropoda
- Subclass: Caenogastropoda
- Order: incertae sedis
- Family: Pachychilidae
- Genus: Brotia
- Species: B. binodosa

Binomial name
- Brotia binodosa (Blanford, 1903)

Synonyms
- Brotia (Brotia) binodosa (Blanford, 1903); ''Brotia (Brotia) binodosa binodosa (Blanford, 1903); Brotia binodosa binodosa (W. T. Blanford, 1903); Brotia binodosa spiralis Brandt, 1974 (junior synonym); Brotia spinata - (partim.); Melania binodosa Blanford, 1903 (original combination)

= Brotia binodosa =

Species of gastropod

Brotia binodosa is a species of freshwater snail with an operculum. It is an aquatic gastropod mollusk in the family Pachychilidae.

== Distribution ==
This species is found in Thailand.

== Human use ==
It is a part of ornamental pet trade for freshwater aquaria.
