= Sulcospira schmidti =

- Apertural view of a shell of Sulcospira schmidti

Scientific classification
- Kingdom: Animalia
- Phylum: Mollusca
- Class: Gastropoda
- Subclass: Caenogastropoda
- Order: incertae sedis
- Family: Pachychilidae
- Genus: Sulcospira
- Species: S. schmidti

Binomial name
- Sulcospira schmidti (von Martens, 1908)

Synonyms
- Melania (Brotia) schmidti von Martens, 1908

Species of gastropod

Sulcospira schmidti is a species of freshwater snail with an operculum, an aquatic gastropod mollusk in the family Pachychilidae.

== Distribution ==
This species occurs in:

- Indonesia
