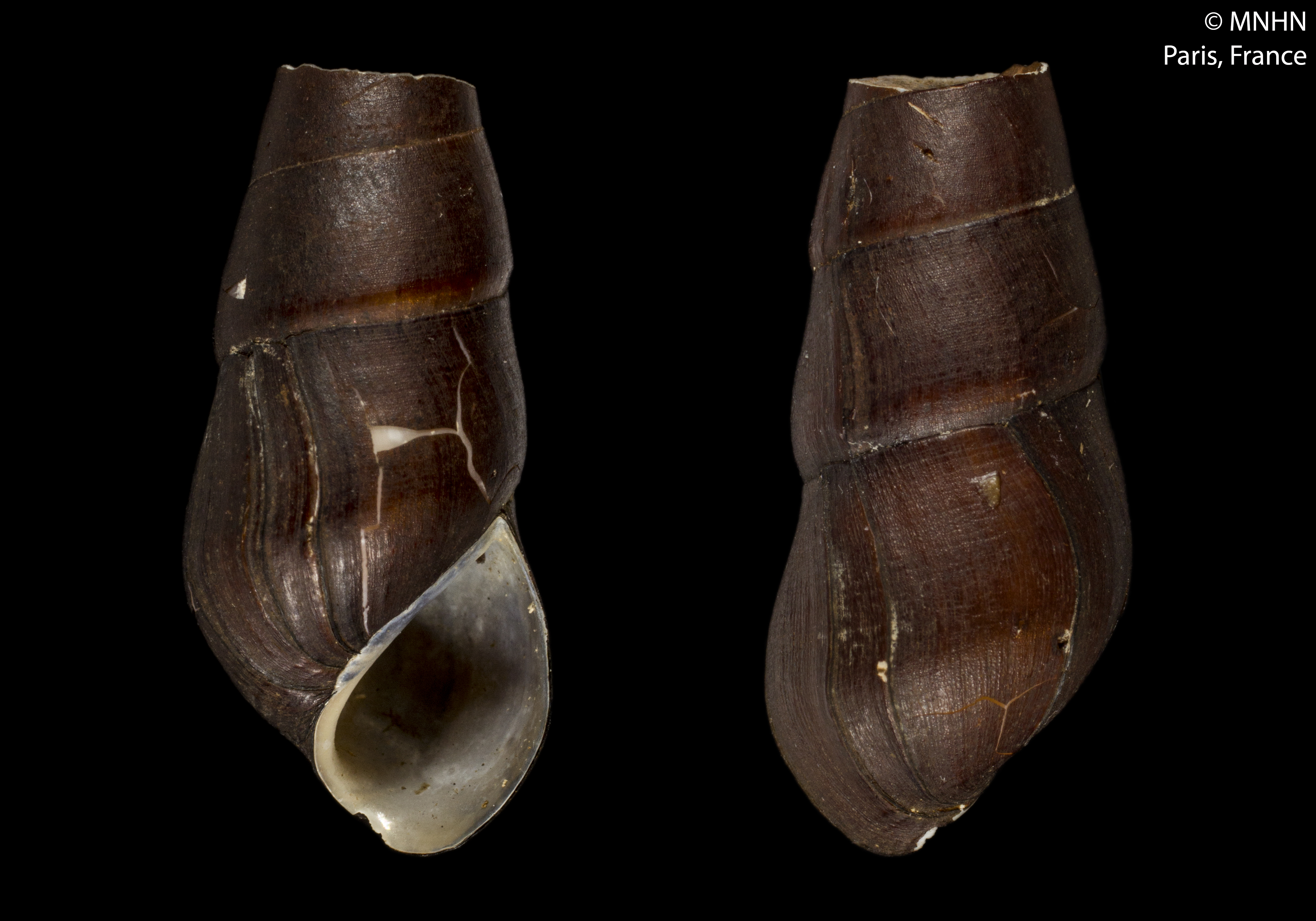
- Shell of Potadoma freethi (syntype at MNHN, Paris)

Scientific classification
- Kingdom: Animalia
- Phylum: Mollusca
- Class: Gastropoda
- Subclass: Caenogastropoda
- Order: incertae sedis
- Superfamily: Cerithioidea
- Family: Pachychilidae
- Genus: Potadoma; Swainson, 1840

Type species
- Melania freethi Gray, 1831

Synonyms
- Goodrichia Clench, 1929 (junior synonym); † Melania (Platymelania) Leriche, 1938 (junior subjective synonym); Melania (Potadoma) Swainson, 1840 (considered a separate genus); † Platymelania Leriche, 1938 (junior subjective synonym); Rhinomelania E. von Martens, 1901 (junior synonym); Semisinus (Rhinomelania) E. von Martens, 1901 (junior synonym)

= Potadoma =

Genus of freshwater snails

Potadoma is a genus of gastropods belonging to the family Pachychilidae.

The species of this genus are found in Africa and Caribbean.

Species:

- Potadoma alutacea Pilsbry & Bequaert, 1927
- Potadoma angulata Thiele, 1928
- Potadoma bicarinata Mandahl-Barth, 1967
- Potadoma bifidicincta (Cox, 1926)
- Potadoma brevissima (Cox, 1926)
- Potadoma buttikoferi (Schepman, 1888)
- Potadoma emerenciae (Adam, 1959)
- Potadoma freethi (Gray, 1831)
- Potadoma graptoconus Pilsbry & Bequaert, 1927
- Potadoma ignobilis (Thiele, 1911)
- Potadoma kadeii Samé-Ekobo & Kristensen, 1985
- Potadoma kanyatsiae Van Damme & Pickford, 2003
- Potadoma kyeoroensis Van Damme & Pickford, 2003
- Potadoma liberiensis (Schepman, 1888)
- Potadoma liricincta (E.A.Smith, 1888)
- Potadoma lomekwiensis Williamson, 1985
- Potadoma moerchi (Reeve, 1859)
- Potadoma mupandae Van Damme & Pickford, 2003
- Potadoma nageli Van Damme & Pickford, 2003
- Potadoma nyakabingoensis Van Damme & Pickford, 2003
- Potadoma nyongensis Spence, 1928
- Potadoma olivoidea Van Damme & Pickford, 2003
- Potadoma plicata Van Damme & Pickford, 2003
- Potadoma ponthiervillensis (Dupuis & Putzeys, 1900)
- Potadoma rahmi E.Binder, 1955
- Potadoma riperti Samé-Ekobo & Kristensen, 1985
- Potadoma schoutedeni Pilsbry & Bequaert, 1927
- Potadoma sebugoroensis Van Damme & Pickford, 2003
- Potadoma sengae Van Damme & Pickford, 2003
- Potadoma spinifera Van Damme & Pickford, 2003
- Potadoma togoensis Thiele, 1928
- Potadoma trochiformis (Clench, 1929)
- Potadoma undulosa Van Damme & Pickford, 2003
- Potadoma unicincta Van Damme & Pickford, 2003
- Potadoma vogelii E.Binder, 1955
- Potadoma wansoni Bequaert & Clench, 1941
- Potadoma zenkeri (E.von Martens, 1901)

Synonyms

- Potadoma agglutinans Bequaert & Clench, 1941: synonym of Melanoides agglutinans (Bequaert & Clench, 1941) (original combination)
- Potadoma bequaerti E. Binder, 1963: synonym of Potadoma liberiensis (Schepman, 1888)
- Potadoma ganahli Connolly, 1930 †: synonym of Neothauma ganahli (Connolly, 1930) † (new combination)
- Potadoma medjeorum Pilsbry & Bequaert, 1927: synonym of Potadoma liricincta (E. A. Smith, 1888)
- Potadoma mungwana Pilsbry & Bequaert, 1927: synonym of Potadoma ignobilis (Thiele, 1911) (junior synonym)
- Potadoma pokoensis Pilsbry & Bequaert, 1927: synonym of Potadoma liricincta (E. A. Smith, 1888) (junior synonym)
- Potadoma superba Pilsbry & Bequaert, 1927: synonym of Potadoma ponthiervillensis (Dupuis & Putzeys, 1900) (junior synonym)
- Potadoma tigrinum Connolly, 1938: synonym of Potadoma freethi tigrinum Connolly, 1938
- Potadoma tornata (Martens, 1892): synonym of Potadoma liricincta (E. A. Smith, 1888)
