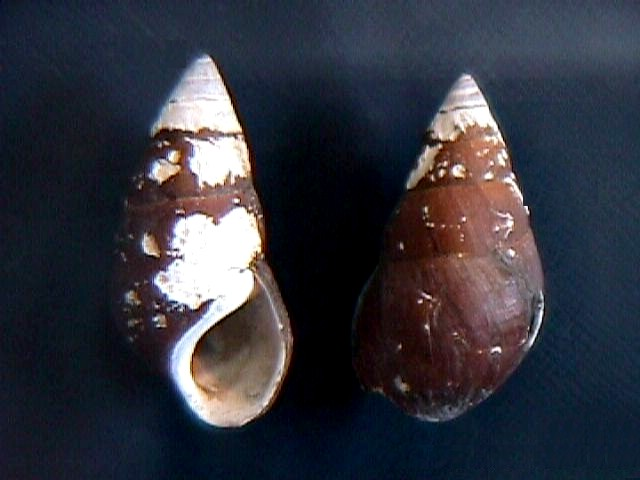
- Two shells of Pachychilus laevissimus

Scientific classification
- Kingdom: Animalia
- Phylum: Mollusca
- Class: Gastropoda
- Subclass: Caenogastropoda
- Order: incertae sedis
- Family: Pachychilidae
- Genus: Pachychilus
- Species: P. laevissimus

Binomial name
- Pachychilus laevissimus (Sowerby I, 1824)

= Pachychilus laevissimus =

Species of gastropod

Pachychilus laevissimus is a species of freshwater snail with an operculum, an aquatic gastropod mollusk in the family Pachychilidae. The species was first described by G.B. Sowerby I in 1824.

== Distribution ==
This species occurs in Venezuela.
