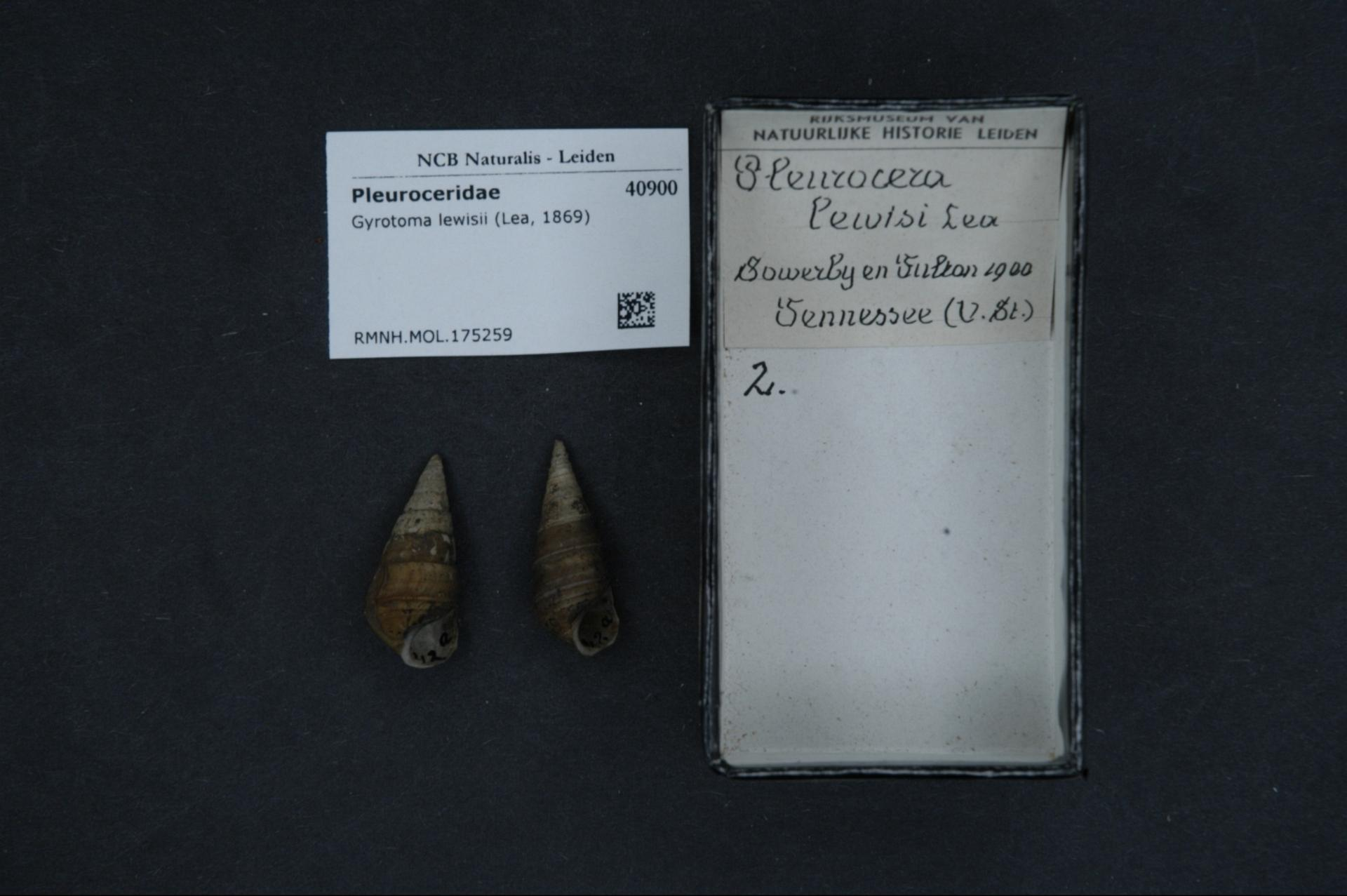
- Gyrotoma lewisii

Conservation status
- Extinct (middle of 1960s)

Scientific classification
- Kingdom: Animalia
- Phylum: Mollusca
- Class: Gastropoda
- Subclass: Caenogastropoda
- Order: incertae sedis
- Superfamily: Cerithioidea
- Family: Pleuroceridae
- Genus: †Gyrotoma; Shuttleworth, 1845

= Gyrotoma =

Genus of gastropods

Gyrotoma is a genus of extinct freshwater snails with an operculum, aquatic gastropod mollusks in the family Pleuroceridae. This genus was endemic to the USA.

All of the species within this genus are presumed extinct. They were native to the main channel of the Coosa River in Alabama, where the last suitable habitat was destroyed by the filling of the reservoir Logan Martin Lake in the mid-1960s.

== Species ==
Species within the genus Gyrotoma include:

- †Gyrotoma excisa (I. Lea, 1843) – excised slitshell
- †Gyrotoma lewisii (I. Lea, 1869) – striate slitshell
- †Gyrotoma pagoda (I. Lea, 1845) – pagoda slitshell
- †Gyrotoma pumila (I. Lea, 1860) – ribbed slitshell
- †Gyrotoma pyramidata (Shuttleworth, 1845) – pyramid slitshell
- †Gyrotoma walkeri (H. H. Smith, 1924) – round slitshell
