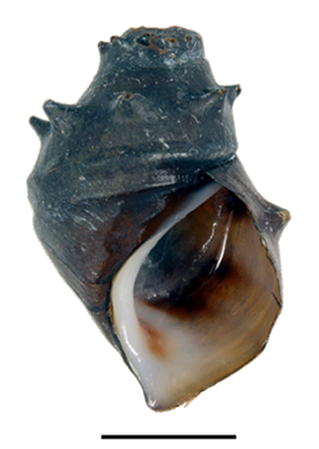
- Apertural view of a shell of Brotia armata. Scale bar is 10 mm.

Conservation status
- Least Concern (IUCN 3.1)

Scientific classification
- Kingdom: Animalia
- Phylum: Mollusca
- Class: Gastropoda
- Subclass: Caenogastropoda
- Order: incertae sedis
- Family: Pachychilidae
- Genus: Brotia
- Species: B. armata

Binomial name
- Brotia armata (Brandt, 1968)

Synonyms
- Brotia (Paracrostoma) pseudosulcospira armata Brandt, 1968; Brotia morrisonii Brandt, 1974; Paracrostoma morrisoni Brandt, 1974 (junior synonym); Brotia pseudosulcospira armata Brandt, 1968 (original combination); Paracrostoma paludiformis dubiosa Brandt, 1974; Paracrostoma pseudosulcospira ssp. armata Brandt, 1968

= Brotia armata =

Species of gastropod

Brotia armata is a species of freshwater snail with an operculum, an aquatic gastropod mollusk in the family Pachychilidae.

== Distribution ==
This species occurs in Thailand.

== Human use ==
It is a part of ornamental pet trade for freshwater aquaria.
