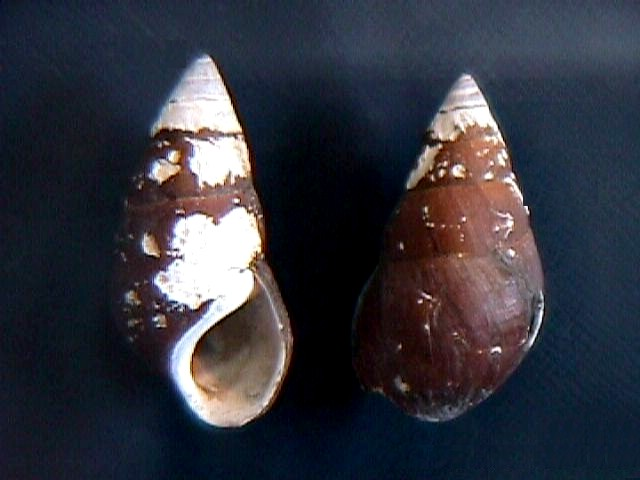
- Two shells of Pachychilus laevissimus

Scientific classification
- Kingdom: Animalia
- Phylum: Mollusca
- Class: Gastropoda
- Subclass: Caenogastropoda
- Superfamily: Cerithioidea
- Family: Pachychilidae
- Genus: Pachychilus; I. Lea & H. C. Lea, 1851

Type species
- Melania laevissima G. B. Sowerby I, 1824

Synonyms
- Cercimelania P. Fischer & Crosse, 1892 (invalid: unnecessary replacement name for Pachychilus); Melania (Pachychilus) I. Lea & H. C. Lea, 1851; Oxymelania Crosse & P. Fischer, 1892; Pachycheilus H. Adams & A. Adams, 1854 (invalid: unjustified emendation of Pachychilus); Pachychilus (Glyptomelania) Crosse & P. Fischer, 1892· accepted, alternate representation; Pachychilus (Oxymelania) Crosse & P. Fischer, 1892· accepted, alternate representation; Pachychilus (Pachychilus) I. Lea & H. C. Lea, 1851· accepted, alternate representation; Pachychilus (Pilsbrychilus) J. P. E. Morrison, 1951 (junior synonym of Pachychilus); Pachychilus (Potamanax) Pilsbry, 1893· accepted, alternate representation; Sphaeromelania Rovereto, 1899 (invalid: unnecessary replacement name for Pachychilus)

= Pachychilus =

Genus of gastropods

Pachychilus, common name the jute snails, is a genus of freshwater snails with an operculum, aquatic gastropod mollusk in the family Pachychilidae.

Pachychilus is the type genus of the family Pachychilidae.

== Distribution ==
The distribution of species in the genus Pachychilus includes:

- Cuba (2 species), Venezuela, Belize, Mexico, and others.

== Species ==
Species within the genus Pachychilus include:

- † Pachychilus anagrammatus Dall, 1913
- Pachychilus apheles F. G. Thompson, 1967
- Pachychilus apis (I. Lea & H. C. Lea, 1851)
- Pachychilus atratus Pilsbry & Hinkley, 1910
- † Pachychilus caboblanquensis Weisbord, 1962
- † Pachychilus cancelloides (Aldrich, 1911)
- † Pachychilus canoasensis Olsson, 1931
- Pachychilus chrysalis (Brot, 1872)
- Pachychilus cinereus (Morelet, 1849)
- Pachychilus conicus (d'Orbigny, 1842)
- Pachychilus corpulentus F. G. Thompson, 1967
- Pachychilus corvinus (Morelet, 1849)
- Pachychilus cumingii I. Lea & H. C. Lea, 1851
- Pachychilus dalli Pilsbry, 1896
- † Pachychilus dimorphica (Woods, 1922)
- Pachychilus explicatus P. Fischer & Crosse, 1892
- Pachychilus fuentesi Aguayo, 1936
- † Pachychilus fulvus Garvie, 2013 †
- Pachychilus gassiesii (Reeve, 1860)
- Pachychilus glaphyrus (Morelet, 1849)
- Pachychilus godmanni (Tristram, 1863)
- Pachychilus gracilis Tristram, 1864
- † Pachychilus gracillimus (Pilsbry & Olsson, 1935)
- Pachychilus graphium (Morelet, 1849)
- Pachychilus hellerii (Brot, 1872)
- Pachychilus hinkleyi (W. B. Marshall, 1920)
- Pachychilus humerosus Pilsbry & Hinkley, 1910
- Pachychilus immanis (Morelet, 1851)
- Pachychilus indiorum (Morelet, 1849)
- Pachychilus intermedius (von dem Busch, 1844)
- Pachychilus jansoni H. Adams, 1871
- Pachychilus lacustris (Morelet, 1849)
- Pachychilus laevissimus (G.B. Sowerby I, 1824)
- Pachychilus largillierti (Philippi, 1843)
- Pachychilus larvatus (Brot, 1877)
- Pachychilus liebmanni (Philippi, 1848)
- Pachychilus moctezumensis Pilsbry & Hinkley, 1910
- Pachychilus monachus Pilsbry & Hinkley, 1910
- Pachychilus nigratus (Poey, 1858) - endemic to Villa Clara, Cuba
- Pachychilus obeliscus (Reeve, 1861)
- Pachychilus oerstedii Mörch, 1861
- Pachychilus olssoni Pilsbry, 1950
- Pachychilus panucula (Morelet, 1851)
- Pachychilus pasionensis Pilsbry, 1956
- Pachychilus pilsbryi E. von Martens, 1899
- Pachychilus planensis (I. Lea, 1858)
- Pachychilus pleurotoma Pilsbry & Hinkley, 1910
- Pachychilus pluristriatus (Say, 1831)
- Pachychilus polygonatus (I. Lea & H. C. Lea, 1851)
- Pachychilus potomarchus Pilsbry, 1893
- Pachychilus pottsianus Hinkley, 1920
- Pachychilus pyramidalis (Morelet, 1849)
- Pachychilus radix (Brot, 1872)
- Pachychilus rasconensis Thiele, 1928
- Pachychilus rivorosai Pilsbry, 1893
- Pachychilus rubidus (I. Lea, 1857)
- Pachychilus rusticulus (von dem Busch, 1858)
- Pachychilus salvini (Tristram, 1863)
- Pachychilus sargi (Crosse & P. Fischer, 1875)
- † Pachychilus satillensis (Aldrich, 1911)
- Pachychilus saussurei (Brot, 1860)
- Pachychilus schiedeanus (Philippi, 1843)
- Pachychilus schumoi Pilsbry, 1931
- Pachychilus subexaratus Crosse & P. Fischer, 1891
- Pachychilus subnodosus (Philippi, 1847)
- Pachychilus suturalis Pilsbry & Hinkley, 1910
- † Pachychilus tarataranoides (O. Haas, 1942)
- † Pachychilus terebriformis (J. Morris, 1859)
- Pachychilus tristis Pilsbry & Hinkley, 1910
- Pachychilus turati (A. Villa & G. B. Villa, 1854)
- Pachychilus vallesensis Hinkley, 1907

subgenus Pachychiloides Wenz, 1939

- † Pachychilus lawtoni Perrilliat, Vega, Espinosa & Naranjo-Garcia, 2008 - fossil from Northeastern Mexico

Species brought into synonymy

- Pachychilus aquatilis (Reeve, 1859): synonym of Doryssa aquatilis (Reeve, 1859)
- Pachychilus drakei Arnold & Hannibal in Hannibal, 1912 †: synonym of Goniobasis drakei (Arnold & Hannibal in Hannibal, 1912) † (new combination)
- Pachychilus glaphyra (Morelet, 1849): synonym of Pachychilus glaphyrus (Morelet, 1849) (incorrect gender of species epithet)
- Pachychilus indifferens Crosse & P. Fischer, 1891: synonym of Pachychilus corvinus indifferens Crosse & P. Fischer, 1891 (unaccepted rank)
- Pachychilus lawsoni Hannibal, 1912 †: synonym of Lymnaea lawsoni (Hannibal, 1912) † (new combination)
- Pachychilus parvum I. Lea, 1857: synonym of Rehderiella parva (I. Lea, 1857) (original combination)
- Pachychilus pila Pilsbry & Hinkley, 1910: synonym of Amnipila pila (Pilsbry & Hinkley, 1910) (original combination)
- Pachychilus renovatus (Brot, 1862): synonym of Pachychilus cumingii I. Lea & H. C. Lea, 1851 (replacement name for Pachychilus cumingii I. Lea & H. C. Lea, 1851 as a secondary homonym)
- Pachychilus reticancellata [sic] †: synonym of Pachychilus recticancellata (Kobayashi & Suzuki, 1939) † (incorrect subsequent spelling)
- Pachychilus suavis Dall, 1913 †: synonym of Goniobasis suavis (Dall, 1913) †
- Pachychilus tristrami Crosse & P. Fischer, 1892: synonym of Pachychilus gracilis Tristram, 1864 (invalid: unnecessary replacement name for Pachychilus gracilis)
- Pachychilus violaceus (Preston, 1911) - endemic to the area from Santiago de Cuba to Baracoa, Cuba: synonym of Pachychilus nigratus (Poey, 1858) (junior synonym)
- Pachychilus vulneratus P. Fischer & Crosse, 1892: synonym of Pachychilus chrysalis (Brot, 1872) (junior synonym)

== Human use ==
One of the Maya peoples, the Lacandon people, now Mexico's native peoples from state Chiapas, use Pachychilus indiorum, known locally as "t’unu", as a type of protein supplement to their diet when animal protein is unavailable. In addition, the shells from this "chuti" snail have great nutritional value, as they provide calcium and slaked lime when burnt. They are often preferred as a lime source over local limestone or other freshwater snail species for their purity as an alkali. The slaked lime is added to maize during the process of making maize dough for tortillas, pozole, and other foods. Slaked lime allows the release of amino acids such as tryptophan and lysine and the vitamin niacin, which would otherwise be unavailable from the maize (unable to be metabolized) if the lime were not added.
