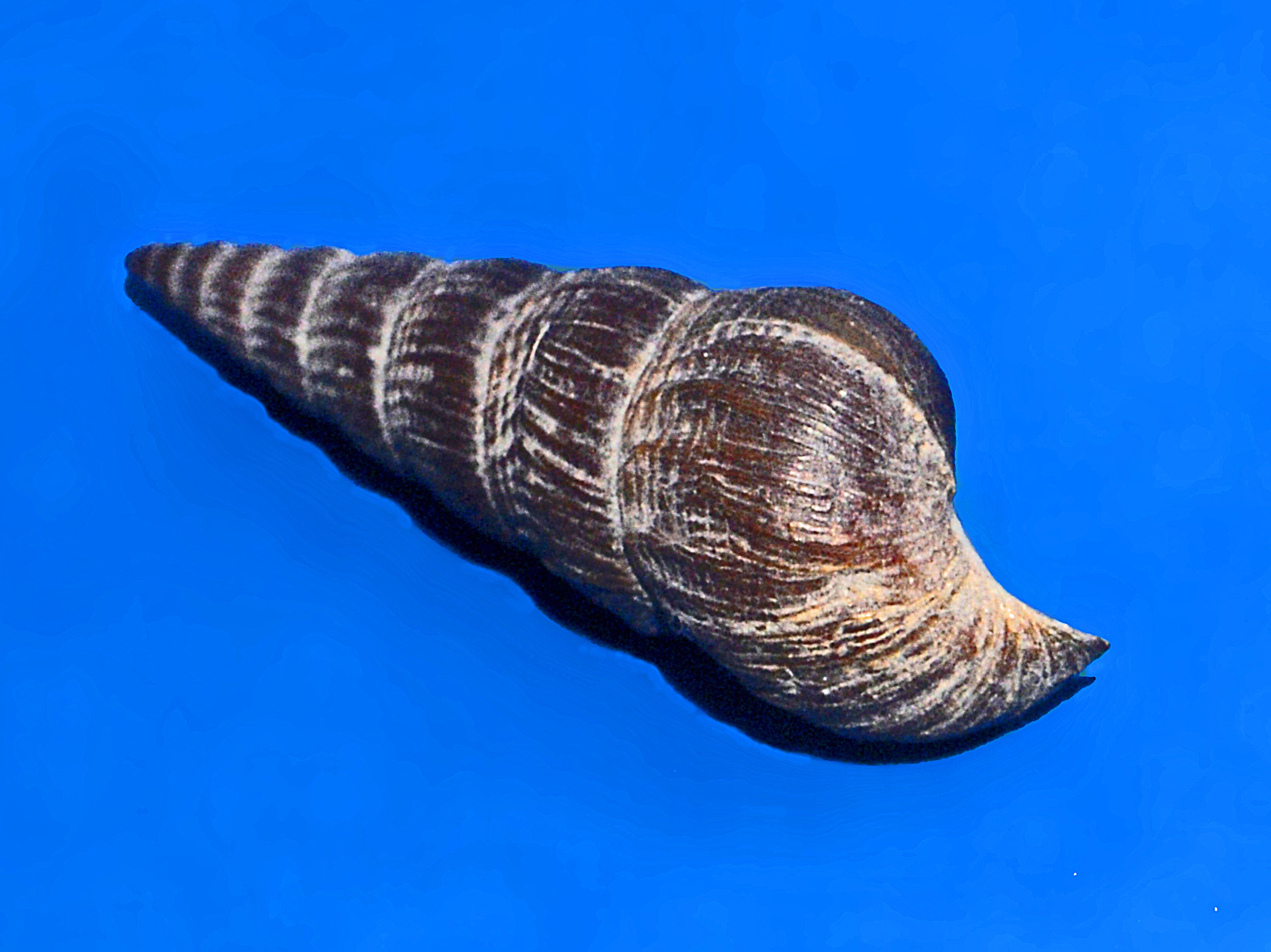
- A shell of Jagora asperata from Philippines on display at the Museo Civico di Storia Naturale di Milano

Scientific classification
- Kingdom: Animalia
- Phylum: Mollusca
- Class: Gastropoda
- Subclass: Caenogastropoda
- Order: incertae sedis
- Family: Pachychilidae
- Genus: Jagora
- Species: J. asperata

Binomial name
- Jagora asperata (Lamarck, 1822)

Synonyms
- Melania asperata Lamarck, 1822; Brotia asperata (Lamarck, 1822); Melania dactylus I. Lea & H. C. Lea, 1850; Melania filocarinata Brot, 1874; Melania pagodulus Reeve, 1859; Melania philippinarum G. B. Sowerby I, 1838; Melania pulchra Busch, 1848

= Jagora asperata =

Species of gastropod

Jagora asperata is a species of freshwater snail with an operculum, an aquatic gastropod mollusk in the family Pachychilidae. Jagora asperata is the type species of the genus Jagora.

== Description ==
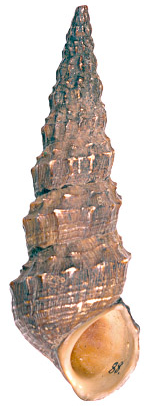
Apertural view of a shell of Jagora asperata.

The shell of an adult Jagora asperata can be as long as 50–80 millimetres (2.0–3.1 in) and has a width of about 18 millimetres (0.71 in). This shell is solid, dark brown to yellowish brown, highly tower–shaped, comprising up to twelve whorls. The apical whorl is truncated. The sculpture of the shell shows closely spaced axial ribs and spiral elements with tiny nodules.

The body of these snails is a brown-ish grey to black, with filiform antennae. They are characterized by a unique reproductive system, including a long sperm gutter, a very short a spermatophore bursa and a prominent lateral ridge working as a seminal receptacle. Females carry eggs and juvenile stages within their mantle cavity.

== Ecology ==
Most Jagora asperata spend their time buried under the substrate or hiding under rocks and other materials in day time and are more active at night. These snails omnivores, both feeding on decaying matter, detritus, and algae but as well as live plants near the waterline, or submerged underwater.

== Human use ==
This snail is used as a food source for humans in the Philippines, and is locally referred to as "Suso". It is not to be confused with Faunus ater, which is also referred to as Suso locally.

== Distribution and habitat ==
This species occurs in the northern part of the Philippines, on Luzon, Leyte Island, Samar Island and several other small islands.

They live in stony creeks of montane regions, spending most of their time in the day buried underground or hiding under rocks and other material.
