= Excised slitshell =

Conservation status
- Extinct (IUCN 2.3)

- Presumed Extinct (NatureServe)

Scientific classification
- Kingdom: Animalia
- Phylum: Mollusca
- Class: Gastropoda
- Subclass: Caenogastropoda
- Order: incertae sedis
- Family: Pleuroceridae
- Genus: †Gyrotoma
- Species: †G. excisa

Binomial name
- †Gyrotoma excisa (Lea, 1843)

Synonyms
- List: Anculosa incisa Lea, 1843; Gyrotoma ampla Anthony, 1860; Gyrotoma bulbosa Anthony, 1860; Gyrotoma carinifera Anthony, 1860; Gyrotoma demissa Anthony, 1860; Gyrotoma excisum (Lea, 1843); Gyrotoma ovalis Anthony, 1860; Gyrotoma ovoidea Shuttleworth, 1845; Gyrotoma quadrata Anthony, 1860; Gyrotoma recta Anthony, 1860; Gyrotoma robusta Anthony, 1860; Gyrotoma salebrosa Anthony, 1860; Melania (Schizostoma) excisa Lea, 1843; Melania excisa Lea, 1843; Melatoma alabamense (Lea, 1860); Melatoma ellipticum Reeve, 1861; Melatoma nucula Reeve, 1861; Melatoma quadratum Reeve, 1860; Melatoma rectum Reeve, 1860; Melatoma sphaericum Reeve, 1861; Schizochilus showalterii Lea, 1860; Schizostoma alabamensis Lea, 1860; Schizostoma buddii Lea, 1845; Schizostoma castanea Lea, 1860; Schizostoma constrictum Lea, 1845; Schizostoma curtum Gould, 1844; Schizostoma funiculatum Lea, 1845; Schizostoma glandula Lea, 1860; Schizostoma glans Lea, 1860; Schizostoma hartmanii Lea, 1860; Schizostoma laciniatum Lea, 1845; Schizostoma showalteriana Tryon, 1873; Schizostoma showalterii Lea, 1864; Schizostoma virens Lea, 1860; Schizostoma wheatleyi Lea, 1868

Species of gastropod

The excised slitshell, scientific name †Gyrotoma excisa, was a species of freshwater snail, an aquatic gastropod mollusk in the family Pleuroceridae. This species was endemic to the United States. It is now extinct.
