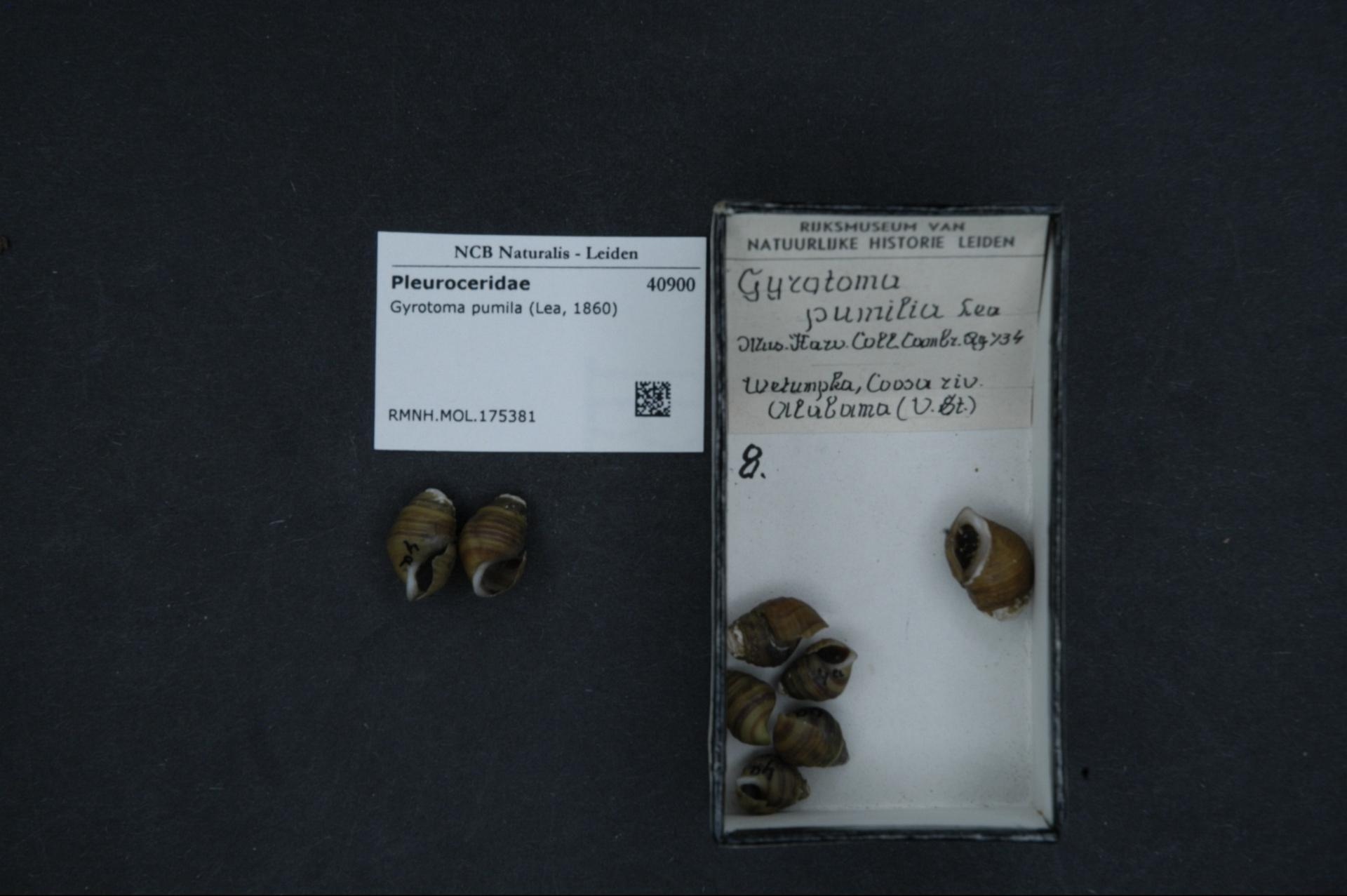
- Dried shells from the Coosa River, Alabama

Conservation status
- Extinct (IUCN 2.3)

- Presumed Extinct (NatureServe)

Scientific classification
- Kingdom: Animalia
- Phylum: Mollusca
- Class: Gastropoda
- Subclass: Caenogastropoda
- Order: incertae sedis
- Family: Pleuroceridae
- Genus: †Gyrotoma
- Species: †G. pumila

Binomial name
- †Gyrotoma pumila (Lea, 1860)

Synonyms
- Gyrotoma hendersoni Goodrich, 1924; Schizostoma excisum Hinkley, 1904; Schizostoma globosa Lea, 1860; Schizostoma pumila Lea, 1860

= Ribbed slitshell =

Species of gastropod

The ribbed slitshell, scientific name Gyrotoma pumila, was a species of freshwater snail with a gill and an operculum, an aquatic gastropod mollusk in the family Pleuroceridae. This species was endemic to the United States. The IUCN conducted an assessment in 2000 that determined the ribbed slitshell was extinct. This status was published in the 2000 Red List.
