= Sulcospira =

- Apertural view of a shell of Sulcospira housei

Scientific classification
- Kingdom: Animalia
- Phylum: Mollusca
- Class: Gastropoda
- Subclass: Caenogastropoda
- Order: incertae sedis
- Family: Pachychilidae
- Genus: Sulcospira; Troschel, 1858

Synonyms
- Adamietta Brandt, 1974

Genus of gastropods

Sulcospira is a genus of freshwater snails which have an operculum, aquatic gastropod mollusks in the family Pachychilidae.

== Distribution ==
The distribution of this genus includes: Malaysia, China, Thailand, Indonesia, and Vietnam.

== Species ==
Apertural view of another shell of Sulcospira schmidti

Species within the genus Sulcospira include:

- Sulcospira agrestis (Reeve, 1860)
- Sulcospira circumstriata (Metcalfe, 1851)
- Sulcospira collyra Köhler, Holford, Do & Ho, 2009
- Sulcospira dakrongensis Köhler, Holford, Do & Ho, 2009
- Sulcospira hainanensis (Brot, 1872)
- Sulcospira housei (I. Lea, 1856)
- Sulcospira infracostata (Mousson, 1849)
- Sulcospira kawaluensis Marwoto & Isnaningsih, 2012
- Sulcospira pisum (Brot, 1868)
- Sulcospira provisoria (Brot, 1884)
- Sulcospira quangtriensis Köhler, Holford, Do & Ho, 2009
- Sulcospira schmidti (Martens, 1908)
- Sulcospira sulcospira (Mousson, 1849) - type species of the genus Sulcospira
- Sulcospira testudinaria (von dem Busch, 1842)
- Sulcospira tonkiniana (Morlet, 1886)
- Sulcospira tourannensis (Souleyet, 1852)
- Sulcospira vietnamensis Köhler, Holford, Do & Ho, 2009
