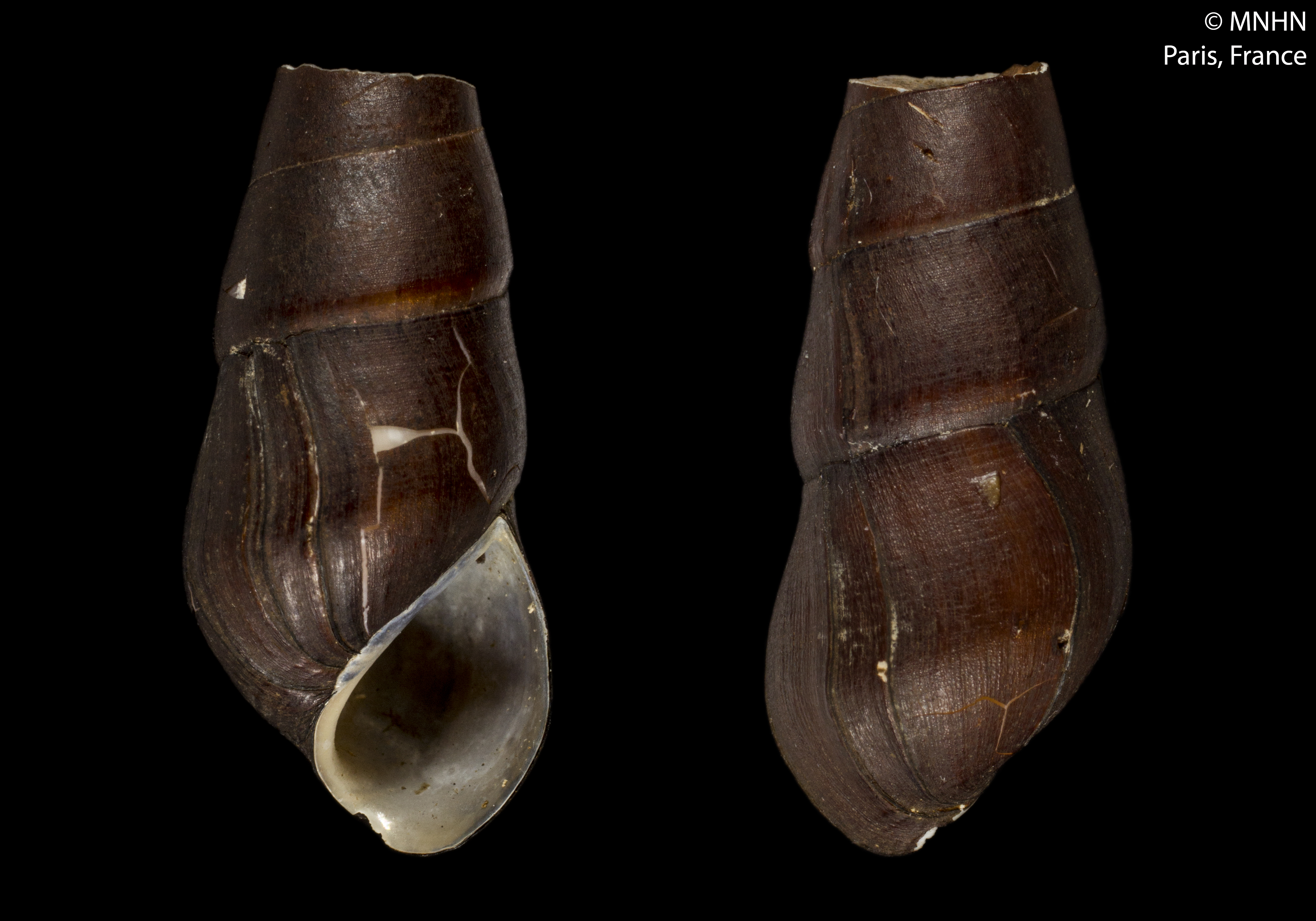

Scientific classification
- Kingdom: Animalia
- Phylum: Mollusca
- Class: Gastropoda
- Subclass: Caenogastropoda
- Order: incertae sedis
- Family: Pachychilidae
- Genus: Potadoma
- Species: P. freethi

Binomial name
- Potadoma freethi (Gray, 1831)

= Potadoma freethi =

Species of gastropod

Potadoma freethi is a species of gastropod belonging to the family Pachychilidae.

The species is found in Africa and Caribbean.
