= Pagoda slitshell =

Conservation status
- Extinct (IUCN 2.3)

- Presumed Extinct (NatureServe)

Scientific classification
- Kingdom: Animalia
- Phylum: Mollusca
- Class: Gastropoda
- Subclass: Caenogastropoda
- Order: incertae sedis
- Family: Pleuroceridae
- Genus: †Gyrotoma
- Species: †G. pagoda

Binomial name
- †Gyrotoma pagoda (Lea, 1845)

Synonyms
- Melatoma anthonyi Reeve, 1861; Melatoma funiculatum Reeve, 1860; Melatoma ornatum Reeve, 1861; Melatoma pagoda Reeve, 1860; Melatoma wetumpkaensis Lea, 1860; Schizostoma pagoda Lea, 1845; Schizostoma pyramidatum Hinkley, 1904; Schizostoma wetumpkaensis Lea, 1860

Species of gastropod

The pagoda slitshell, scientific name †Gyrotoma pagoda, was a species of freshwater snail, a gastropod in the family Pleuroceridae. This species was endemic to the United States. It is now extinct.
