= Pseudopotamis =

Scientific classification
- Kingdom: Animalia
- Phylum: Mollusca
- Class: Gastropoda
- Subclass: Caenogastropoda
- Order: incertae sedis
- Family: Pachychilidae
- Genus: Pseudopotamis von Martens, 1894

Diversity
- 2 species

Genus of gastropods

Pseudopotamis is a genus of freshwater snails which have an operculum, aquatic gastropod mollusks in the family Pachychilidae.

== Distribution ==
It occurs on the Torres Strait Islands.

A sister group (the closest relative) of Pseudopotamis is genus Tylomelania. Pseudopotamis and Tylomelania split in the Middle Miocene c. 19.5 Mya.

== Species ==
Species within the genus Pseudopotamis include:

- Pseudopotamis semoni Martens, 1894
- Pseudopotamis supralirata (E. A. Smith, 1887) - synonym: Pseudopotamis finschi Martens, 1894 - type species

== Description ==
Pallial oviduct evolved into an uterine brood (that release shelled juvenile snails).

== Ecology ==
Species in the genus Pseudopotamis are ovoviviparous.
