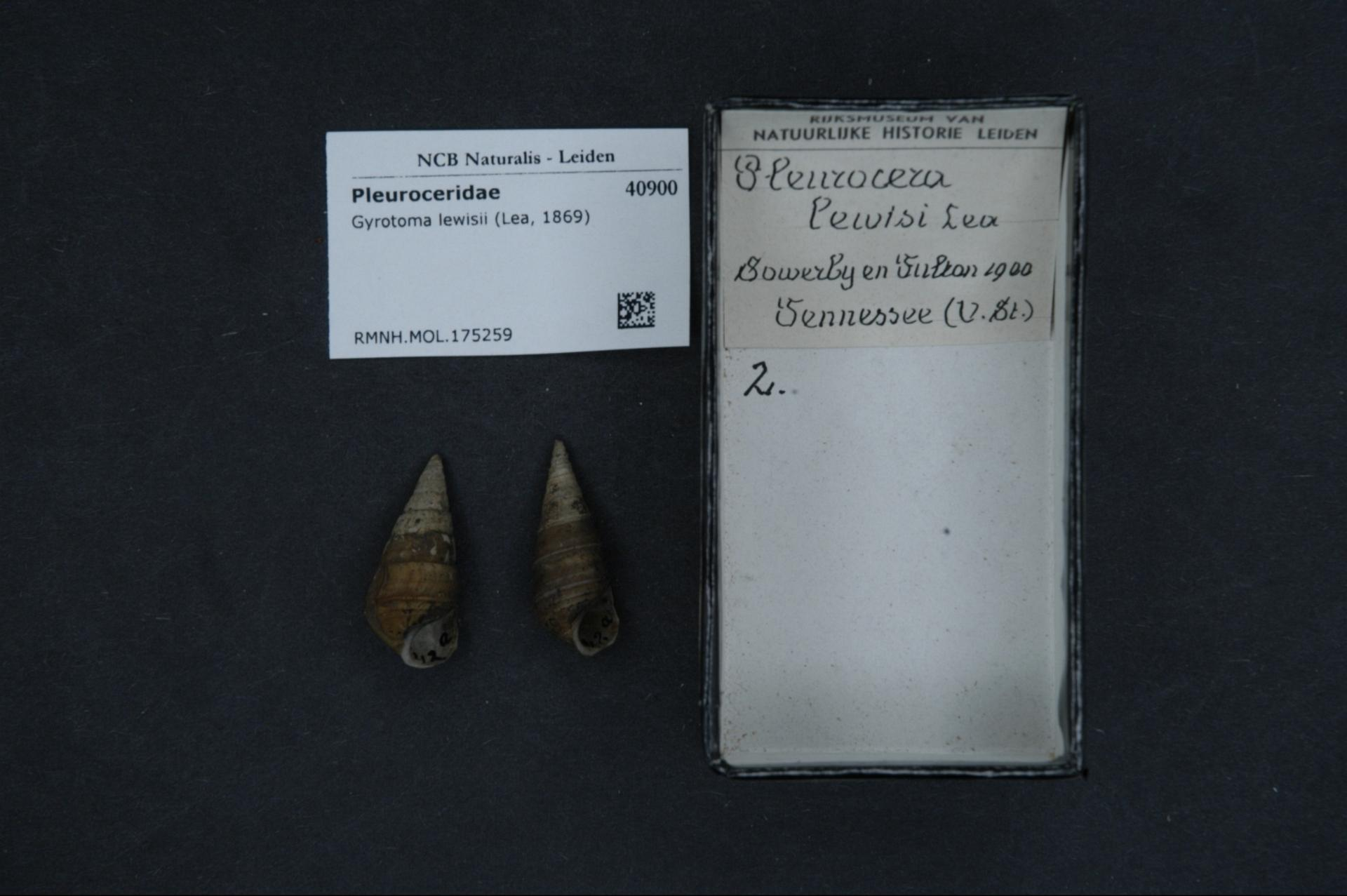
- Dried shells

Conservation status
- Extinct (IUCN 2.3)

- Presumed Extinct (NatureServe)

Scientific classification
- Kingdom: Animalia
- Phylum: Mollusca
- Class: Gastropoda
- Subclass: Caenogastropoda
- Order: incertae sedis
- Family: Pleuroceridae
- Genus: †Gyrotoma
- Species: †G. lewisii

Binomial name
- †Gyrotoma lewisii (Lea, 1869)

Synonyms
- Schizostoma lewisii Lea, 1869

= Striate slitshell =

Species of gastropod

The striate slitshell, scientific name Gyrotoma lewisii, was a species of freshwater snail with a gill and an operculum, an aquatic gastropod mollusk in the family Pleuroceridae. This species was endemic to the United States. It is now extinct.
