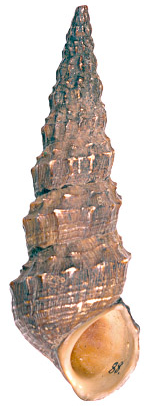
- Apertural view of a shell of Jagora asperata

Scientific classification
- Kingdom: Animalia
- Phylum: Mollusca
- Class: Gastropoda
- Subclass: Caenogastropoda
- Order: incertae sedis
- Family: Pachychilidae
- Genus: Jagora; Köhler & Glaubrecht, 2003

Diversity
- 2 species

= Jagora =

Genus of gastropods

Jagora is a genus of freshwater snails which have an operculum, aquatic gastropod mollusks in the family Pachychilidae.

== Distribution ==
This genus is endemic to the Philippines.

== Species ==
Species within the genus Jagora include:

- Jagora asperata (Lamarck, 1822) - type species
- Jagora dactylus (I. lea & H. C. Lea, 1850)
