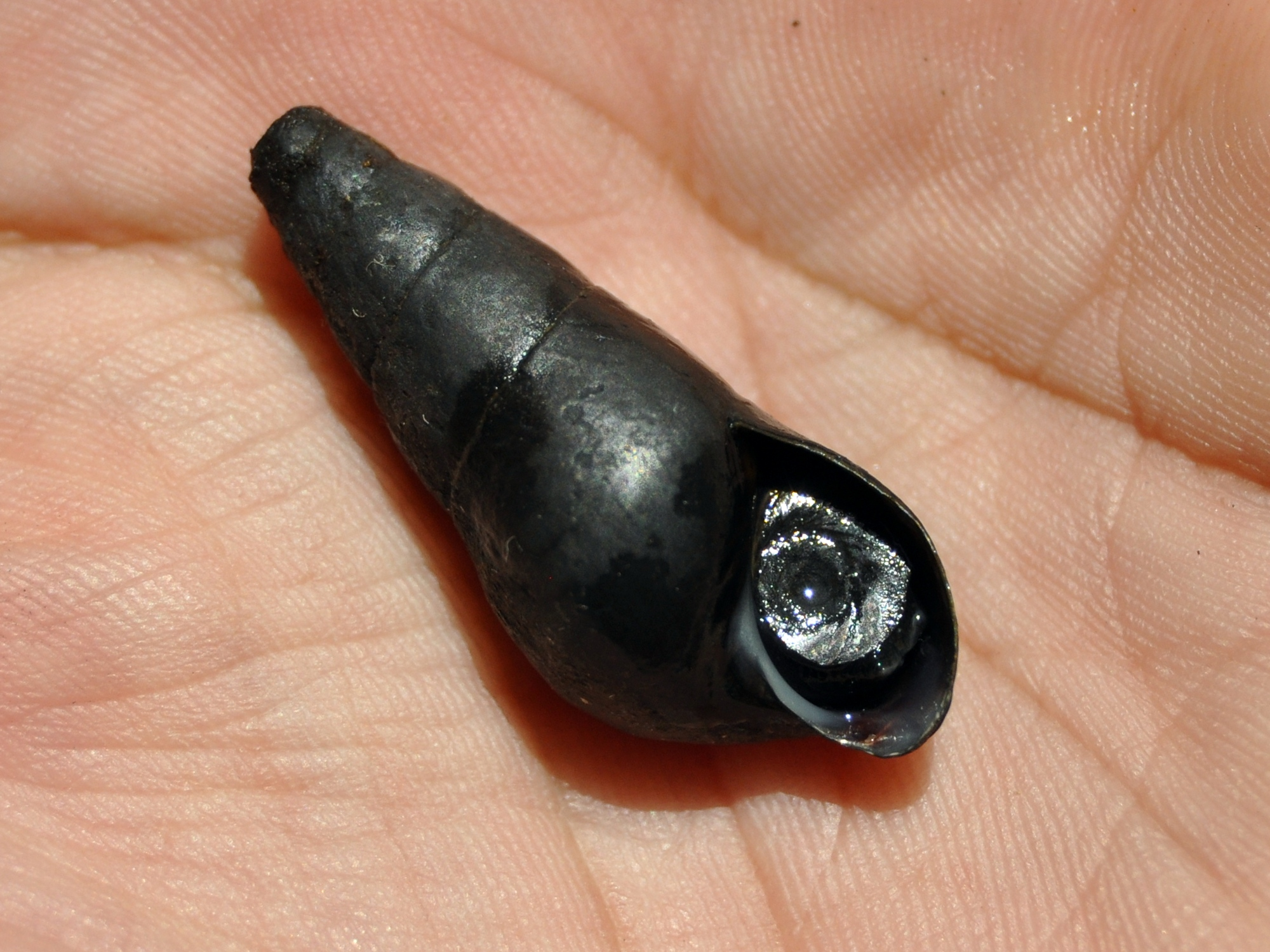
- Sulcospira testudinaria, ca. 30mm h (apex truncated) from Bogor, West Java

Scientific classification
- Domain: Eukaryota
- Kingdom: Animalia
- Phylum: Mollusca
- Class: Gastropoda
- Subclass: Caenogastropoda
- Family: Pachychilidae
- Genus: Sulcospira
- Species: S. testudinaria

Binomial name
- Sulcospira testudinaria (von dem Busch, 1842)

Synonyms
- Brotia testudinaria (Busch, 1842); Melania foeda I. Lea & H. C. Lea, 1850; Melania junghuhni Schepman, 1896 (invalid: junior homonym of Melania junghuhni Martin, 1879; M. martini is a replacement name); Melania martini Schepman, 1898; Melania martini var. flammulata Schepman, 1898; Melania testudinaria von dem Busch, 1842

= Sulcospira testudinaria =

Species of gastropod

Sulcospira testudinaria is a species of freshwater snail with an operculum, an aquatic gastropod mollusk in the family Pachychilidae.

== Distribution ==
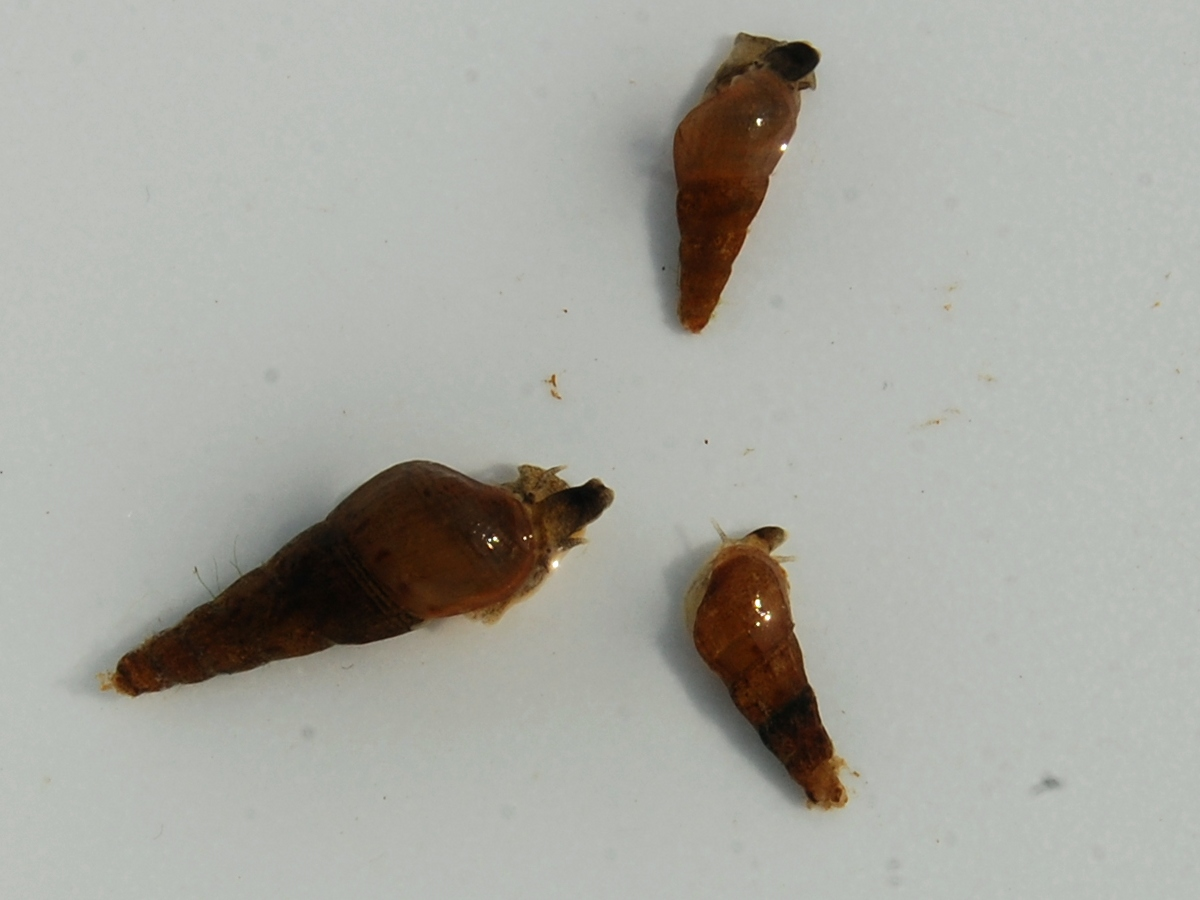
Young specimens

This species occurs in:

- Java
