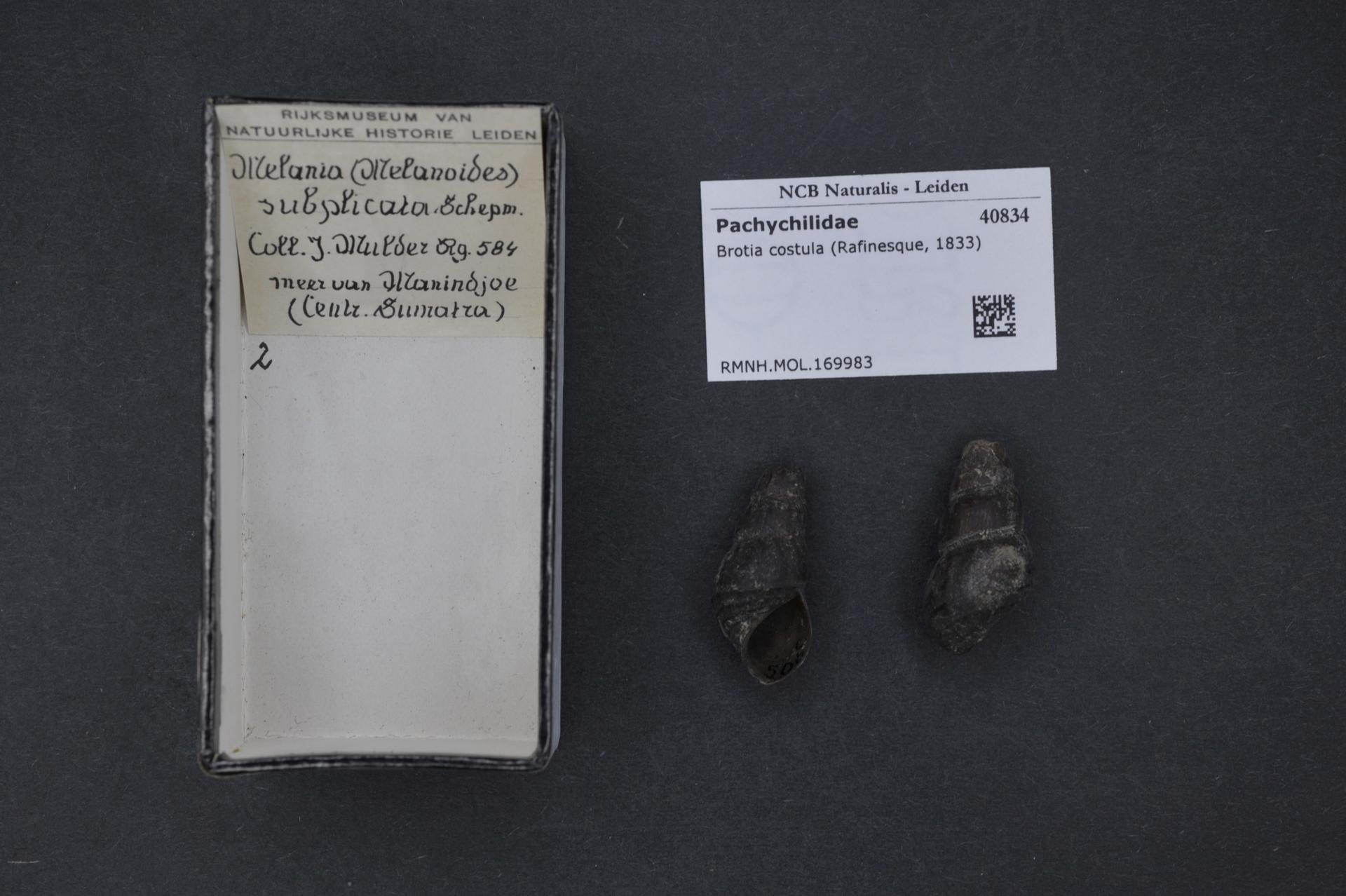
- preserved specimen

Scientific classification
- Domain: Eukaryota
- Kingdom: Animalia
- Phylum: Mollusca
- Class: Gastropoda
- Subclass: Caenogastropoda
- Superfamily: Cerithioidea
- Family: Pachychilidae
- Genus: Brotia
- Species: B. costula

Binomial name
- Brotia costula (Rafinesque, 1833)

Synonyms
- see list

= Brotia costula =

Species of gastropod

Brotia costula is a species of gastropod belonging to the family Pachychilidae.

This species is found in Southeastern Asia.

== Synonyms ==
- Brotia (Brotia) costula (Rafinesque, 1833)
- Brotia (Brotia) costula costula (Rafinesque, 1833)
- Brotia (Brotia) costula varicosa (Troschel, 1837)
- Brotia variabilis (Benson, 1836) (based on an unavailable name)
- Melania (Melanoides) soloensis K. Martin, 1905 † (junior subjective synonym)
- Melania (Melanoides) variabilis Benson, 1836 (superseded combination)
- Melania (Melanoides) variabilis var. microstoma G. Nevill, 1885 (original combination)
- Melania (Melanoides) variabilis var. pseudospinosa G. Nevill, 1885 (superseded combination)
- Melania (Melanoides) variabilis var. semilaevigata G. Nevill, 1885 (original combination)
- Melania (Melanoides) variabilis var. subspinosa G. Nevill, 1885 (original combination)
- Melania (Melanoides) variabilis var. subtuberculata G. Nevill, 1885 (original combination)
- Melania (Melanoides) variabilis var. subvaricosa G. Nevill, 1885 (original combination)
- Melania carolinae Gray in Griffith & Pidgeon, 1833 (junior synonym)
- Melania costula Rafinesque, 1833 (original combination)
- Melania hainesiana I. Lea, 1857
- Melania indica Souleyet, 1852 (junior synonym)
- Melania menkeana "Brot, 1875" (incorrect subsequent spelling of Melania menkiana; not qualifying as an emendation)
- Melania menkeana G. Nevill, 1885 (unjustified emendation of Melania menkiana I. Lea, 1843)
- Melania menkiana I. Lea, 1843 (junior synonym)
- Melania meukiana I. Lea, 1843 (incorrect original spelling; Melania menkiana is an emendation)
- Melania plicata I. Lea, 1838 (invalid: junior homonym of Melania plicata Menke, 1828; M. menkiana is a replacement name)
- Melania spinosa Hanley, 1854 (junior synonym)
- Melania variabilis Benson, 1836 (invalid: junior homonym of Melania variabilis Defrance, 1823)
- Melania variabilis var. aspera Hanley & Theobald, 1874 (invalid: junior homonym of Melania aspera Lesson, 1831)
- Melania variabilis var. cincta Hanley & Theobald, 1874 (invalid: junior homonym of Melania cincta I. Lea & H. C. Lea, 1851)
- Melania variabilis var. microstoma G. Nevill, 1885 (invalid: junior homonym of Melania microstoma I. Lea & H. C. Lea, 1851)
- Melania variabilis var. pseudospinosa G. Nevill, 1885 (junior synonym)
- Melania variabilis var. semilaevigata G. Nevill, 1885 (junior synonym)
- Melania variabilis var. subspinosa G. Nevill, 1885 (junior synonym)
- Melania variabilis var. subtuberculata G. Nevill, 1885 (junior synonym)
- Melania variabilis var. subvaricosa G. Nevill, 1885 (junior synonym)
- Melania varicosa Troschel, 1837
