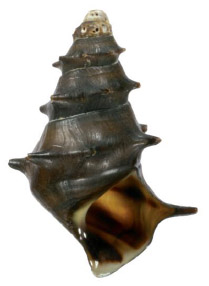
- Apertural view of a shell of Brotia pagodula from the Moei River

Conservation status
- Least Concern (IUCN 3.1)

Scientific classification
- Kingdom: Animalia
- Phylum: Mollusca
- Class: Gastropoda
- Subclass: Caenogastropoda
- Order: incertae sedis
- Family: Pachychilidae
- Genus: Brotia
- Species: B. pagodula

Binomial name
- Brotia pagodula (Gould, 1847)

Synonyms
- Melania pagodula Gould, 1847

= Brotia pagodula =

Species of gastropod

Brotia pagodula is a species of freshwater snail with an operculum, an aquatic gastropod mollusk in the family Pachychilidae.

== Taxonomy ==
Brotia pagodula is the type species of the genus Brotia.

There is evidence from analysis of mtDNA that this species may actually be two distinct species living in the same area.

== Distribution ==
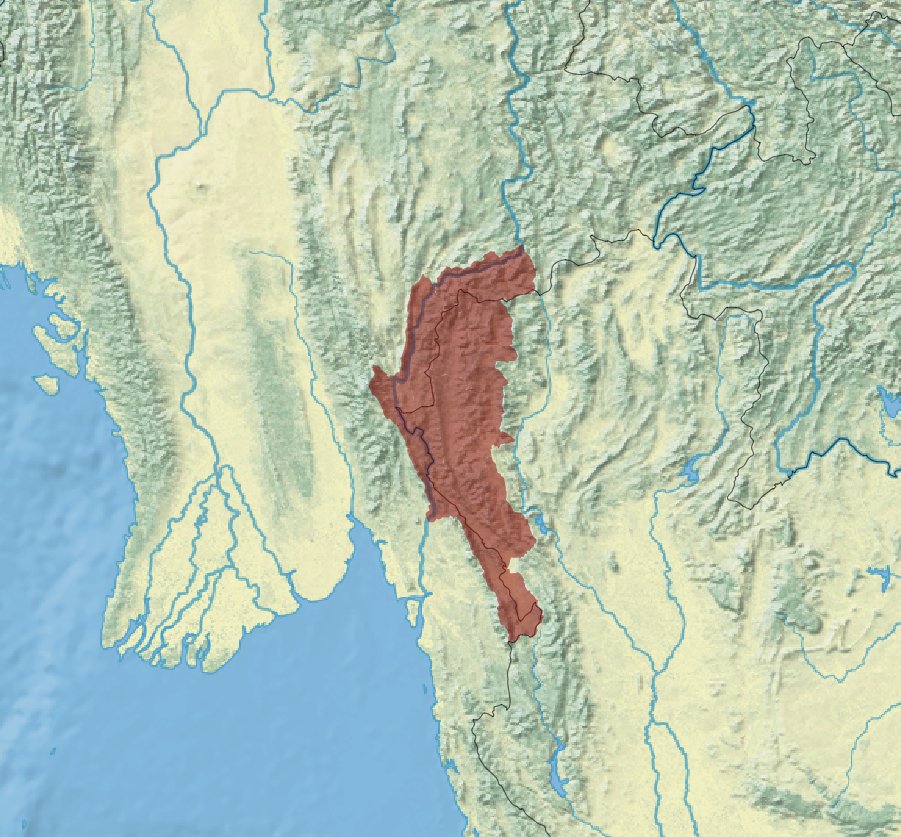
Distribution map of Brotia pagodula.

This species occurs in:

- Myanmar
- Thailand

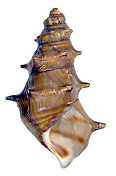
Apertural view of another shell of Brotia pagodula

== Human use ==
It is a part of ornamental pet trade for freshwater aquaria. Common names for the species include the porcupine snail, the pagoda snail, and the horned armour snail.
