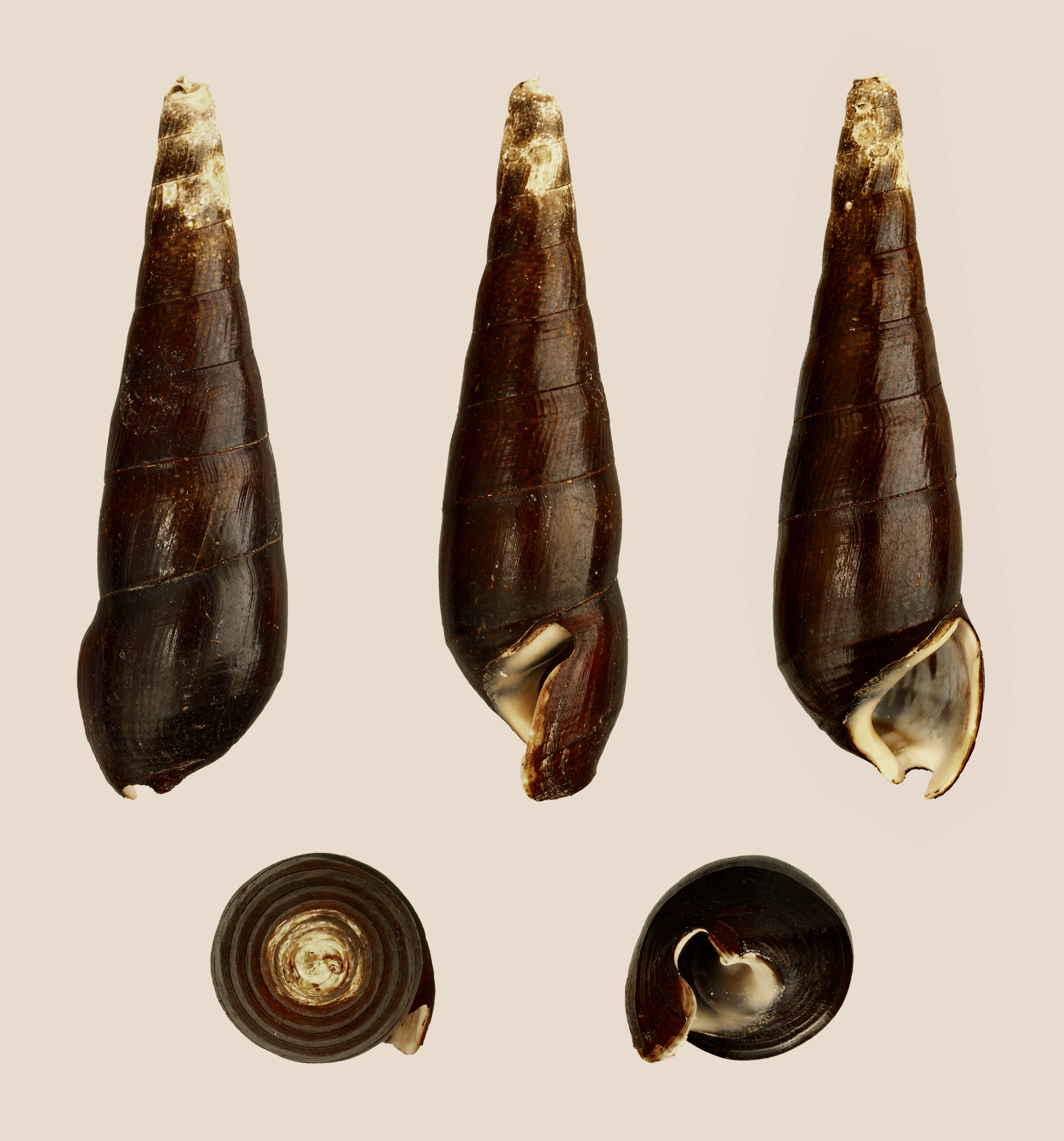
- A shell of Faunus ater

Conservation status
- Least Concern (IUCN 3.1)

Scientific classification
- Kingdom: Animalia
- Phylum: Mollusca
- Class: Gastropoda
- Subclass: Caenogastropoda
- Order: incertae sedis
- Family: Pachychilidae
- Genus: Faunus
- Species: F. ater

Binomial name
- Faunus ater (Linnaeus, 1758)

= Faunus ater =

Species of mollusc

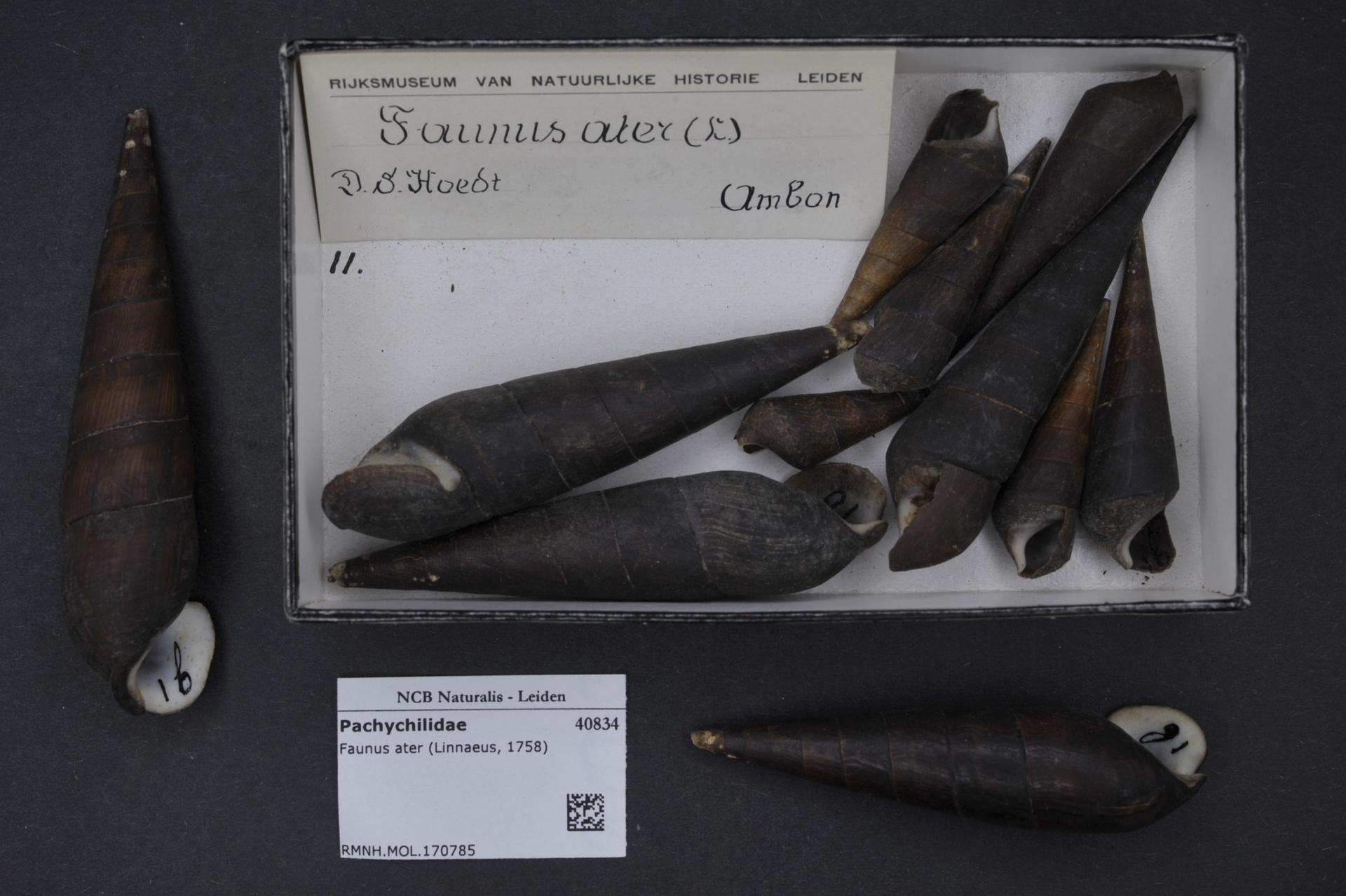
Faunus ater (Linnaeus, 1758). Museum specimens.

Faunus ater is a species of brackish water snail with an operculum, an aquatic gastropod mollusc in the family Pachychilidae.

Faunus ater is the only extant species within the genus Faunus.

== Distribution ==
The distribution of Faunus ater includes:

- India
- Sri Lanka
- Andaman Islands
- Malaysia
- Myanmar
- Thailand
- Singapore
- Indonesia
- Philippines
- New Guinea
- western and southern Pacific Islands: Solomon Islands
- northern Australia
- China

== Description ==
The periostracum is thick, and the color of the periostracum is dark brown or black. The shell has about 20 whorls. The apical whorls may be eroded in older snails. The aperture is ovate and white. The shell is unique among Cerithioidea, because it has two deep sinuses: an anal sinus which is close to the suture and an anterior sinus more forward in the aperture. The height of the aperture is about one-fifth of the height of the shell.

The height of the shell is usually 50–60 mm, but can be up to 90 mm.

The operculum is oval, corneous and dark brown in color.

The snail has a broad snout. The radula is large and is located in a correspondingly large buccal mass.

== Ecology ==
This snail lives in slightly brackish water. It has also been reported from freshwater. It is the only pachychilid species that lives in brackish water; the other species in the family are freshwater snails.

The population density can reach up to 6700 snails per m^{2}.

This snail probably feeds by grazing.

It is oviparous. It probably has free-swimming larvae.

== Human use ==
This snail is used as a food source for humans in the Philippines and in Thailand.
