= Auguste Louis Brot =

Swiss malacologist

- Born: September 18, 1821
- Died: August 30, 1896 (aged 74)
- Education: University of Zurich; University of Paris; University of Berlin
- Known for: Namesake of the genus Brotia
- Scientific career
- Fields: Malacology (conchology)
- Workplaces: Natural History Museum of Geneva
- Author abbrev. (zoology): Brot

Auguste Louis Brot (September 18, 1821 – August 30, 1896) was a Swiss malacologist (conchologist).

After several years of studies in Zurich, Paris, and Berlin, he earned the degree of Doctor in Medicine in 1845. Soon he became deeply interested in natural history, abandoned medicine, returned to Geneva and became a malacologist, with a special interest in terrestrial and aquatic molluscs. For over 40 years he was associated with the Natural History Museum of Geneva.

He was an elected correspondent (1887) of the Academy of Natural Sciences of Philadelphia.

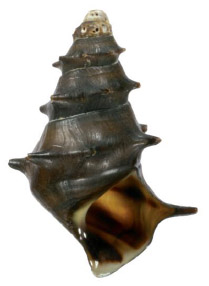
Brotia pagodula

He is a conchological taxon authority and the namesake of the Brotia genus of freshwater snails.

The Geneva museum keeps his book collection and his extensive conchological collection.

== Monographs ==
- 1880: Die Gattung Paludomus auct. (Tanalia, Stomatodon, Philopotamis, Paludomus) (Melaniaceen)
- 1874: Systematisches Conchylien-Cabinet Die Melaniaceen : (Melanidae); in Abbildungen nach der Natur mit Beschreibungen.
- 1874: Die Melaniaceen (Melanidae) in Abbildungen nach der Natur mit Beschreibungen
- 1870: Catalogue of the Recent Species of the Family Melanidae
- 1868: Additions et corrections au catalogue systématique des escèces qui composent la famille des Mélaniens
- 1868: Matériaux pour servir a l'étude de la famille des Melaniens
- 1867: Étude sur les coquilles de la famille des nayades qui habitent le bassin du Léman
- 1862 Matériaux pour servir à l'étude de la famille des mélaniens. Catalogue systematique, Volume 1
- 1860: Description de nouvelles espèces de mélanies
