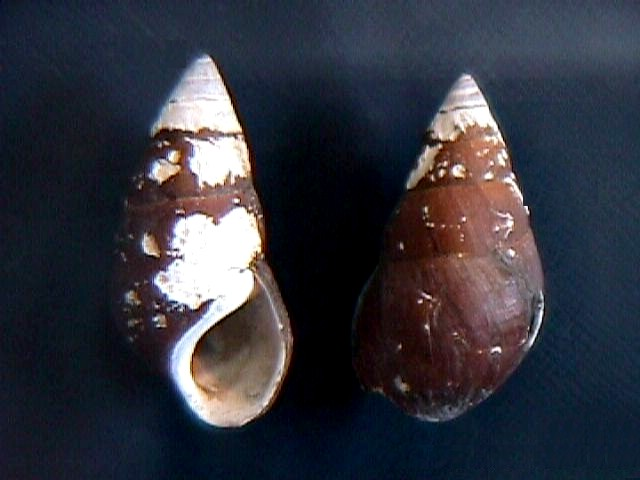
- Two shells of Pachychilus laevissimus

Scientific classification
- Kingdom: Animalia
- Phylum: Mollusca
- Class: Gastropoda
- Subclass: Caenogastropoda
- Order: incertae sedis
- Superfamily: Cerithioidea
- Family: Pachychilidae; P. Fischer & Crosse, 1892

Type genus
- Pachychilus I. Lea & H. C. Lea, 1851

Diversity
- 191-226 extant species

Synonyms
- Brotiinae Golikov & Starobogatov, 1987; Fauninae Cossmann, 1909; Melanatriinae Thiele, 1921; Potadomatinae Pilsbry & Bequaert, 1927

= Pachychilidae =

Pachychilidae Temporal range: Paleogene - recent

Family of gastropods

Pachychilidae, common name pachychilids, is a taxonomic family of freshwater snails, gastropod molluscs in the clade Sorbeoconcha.

== Distribution ==
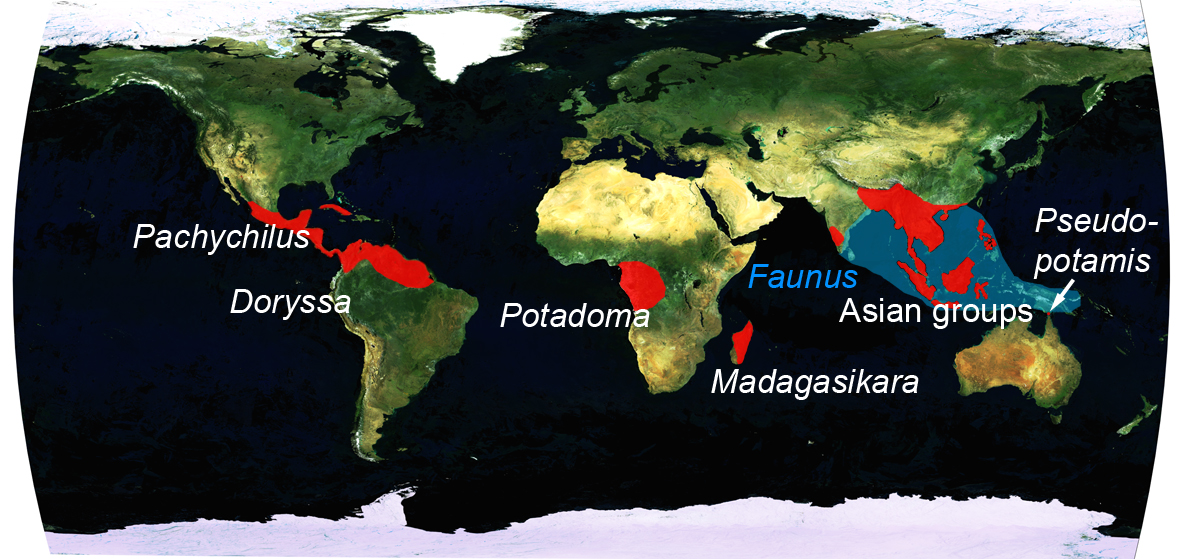
The global distribution of the family Pachychilidae

Pachychilids are freshwater snails with a worldwide distribution in the tropics. Representatives are found in South and Central America, Africa, Madagascar, South and South-east Asia and tropical Australia (Queensland: Torres Strait Islands).

== Description ==
Pachychilids have an operculum, which is concentric and multispiral.

== Ecology ==
All species in the family inhabit freshwater except Faunus ater, which is a brackish water snail found in estuaries and other coastal habitats. Pachychilids are either oviparous (lay eggs), ovoviviparous or viviparous (retain developing eggs and youngs in special incubatory structures).

== Notes on the taxonomy ==
The name is derived from a combination of the words 'pachy' (Greek = thick) and the suffix '-chilus' (Greek = Lip), meaning 'thick lipped' - with respect to the thickened aperture of the shell in some species. Most 20th-century authors did not recognize Pachychilidae as an independent family, but affiliated species under different groups, such as Thiaridae and Pleuroceridae. However, recent revisions based on molecular and morphological evidence have proven their independent and distinct status from the former. This family has no subfamilies (according to the taxonomy of the Gastropoda by Bouchet & Rocroi, 2005).

== Genera ==
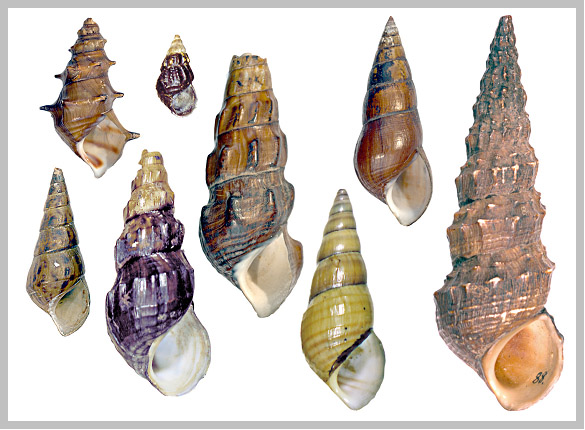
Shells of various pachychilid species

Genera within the family Pachychilidae include:

- † Bellatara Strand, 1928 - with only one species Bellatara janus (Mayer, 1870)
- Brotia H. Adams, 1866
- Doryssa Swainson, 1840
- † Eginea Pacaud & Harzhauser, 2012
- Faunus de Montfort, 1810
- Jagora Köhler & Glaubrecht, 2003
- † Jponsia Pacaud & Harzhauser, 2012
- Madagasikara Köhler & Glaubrecht, 2010 - synonym: Melanatria Bowdich, 1822 auctt.
- † Nodifaunus Olsson, 1944
- Pachychilus I. Lea & H. C. Lea, 1851 - type genus of the family Pachychilidae
- Paracrostoma Cossmann, 1900
- Potadoma Swainson, 1840
- † Pseudobellardia Cox, 1931
- Pseudopotamis Martens, 1894
- Sulcospira Troschel, 1858 - synonym: Adamietta Brandt, 1974
- † Tinnyea Hantken, 1887
- Tylomelania Sarasin & Sarasin, 1897
- † Wingeastonia K. Martin, 1906

Genera brought into synonymy

- Acrostoma Brot, 1871: synonym of Paracrostoma Cossmann, 1900
- Antimelania P. Fischer & Crosse, 1892: synonym of Brotia H. Adams, 1866
- Brotella Rovereto, 1899: synonym of Paracrostoma Cossmann, 1900
- Fauninae Cossmann, 1909 (subfamily) : synonym of Pachychilidae P. Fischer & Crosse, 1892
- Melanatria Bowdich, 1822: synonym of Faunus Montfort, 1810
- Oxymelania Crosse & P. Fischer, 1892: synonym of Pachychilus I. Lea & H. C. Lea, 1851
- Pirena Lamarck, 1822: synonym of Faunus Montfort, 1810
- Sphaeromelania Rovereto, 1899: synonym of Pachychilus I. Lea & H. C. Lea, 1851
- Wanga Chen, 1943: synonym of Brotia H. Adams, 1866

== Cladogram ==
A cladogram based on sequences of mitochondrial 16S ribosomal RNA sequences showing phylogenic relations of Pachychilidae:

- Pachychilidae
  - Faunus ater
  - - - Potadoma freethi
      - Doryssa consolidata
    - - - Sulcospira hainanensis
        - - Sulcospira testudinaria
          - Sulcospira housei
          - - Brotia
              - Brotia pagodula
              - Brotia sumatrensis
            - Paracrostoma
              - Paracrostoma martini
              - Paracrostoma tigrina
      - - - - Pseudopotamis
              - Pseudopotamis supralirata
              - Pseudopotamis semoni
            - Tylomelania
              - Tylomelania perfecta
              - Tylomelania neritiformis
          - Jagora
            - Jagora dactylus
            - Jagora asperata
        - - Pachychilus
            - Pachychilus indiorum
            - Pachychilus conicus
          - Madagasikara
            - Madagasikara madagascariensis
            - - Madagasikara spinosa
              - - Madagasikara zazavavindrano
                - - Madagasikara vazimba
                  - Madagasikara vivipara
